= Grill, Interrupted =

- Modern Family episode
- Episode no.: Season 6 Episode 19
- Directed by: James Bagdonas
- Written by: Paul Corrigan; Brad Walsh; Jeffrey Richman
- Production code: 6ARG21
- Original air date: April 1, 2015

Guest appearances
- Adam DeVine as Andy; Nick Ballard as Will; Pierce Wallace as Joe Pritchett

Episode chronology
← Previous "Spring Break"	Next → "Knock 'Em Down"
- Modern Family season 6

"Grill, Interrupted" is the nineteenth episode of the sixth season of the American sitcom Modern Family, and the series' 139th episode overall. It originally aired on April 1, 2015. The episode was written by Paul Corrigan & Brad Walsh & Jeffrey Richman, and directed by James Bagdonas. In the episode, Alex gets accepted at Caltech, but is acting weird, but her inexplicable behavior leads Claire to believe that she has not praised her enough. The family gathers at Jay’s for his birthday, where Phil tries desperately to impress Jay with a gift of a new grill. Gloria tries to give Manny and Luke a lesson for secretly drinking alcohol. Mitchell and Claire decide to give Jay back the money that he loaned them years prior to help them pay for their houses, without telling Phil nor Cameron. Andy wants to talk to Haley about his feelings, but her presence at Jay and Gloria's, and that of her new boyfriend, Will, makes this difficult.

== Plot ==
The family gathers at Jay (Ed O'Neill) and Gloria's (Sofia Vergara) house for Jay's birthday. Claire (Julie Bowen) and Mitchell (Jesse Tyler Ferguson) decide to pay their father back the money he loaned them years earlier for the down payment on their respective houses. Mitchell intends to use the money that Cameron (Eric Stonestreet) has received from a recently deceased distant relative, and Phil (Ty Burrell) comes to believe the money problems are what have caused the rift between himself and Jay. Phil gifts Jay with a new, state-of-the-art barbecue grill, but after this fails to impress Jay, Phil, Claire, Mitchell, and Cameron begin arguing in about the various monetary issues that have surfaced that day.

Luke (Nolan Gould) and Manny (Rico Rodriguez) come up with a plan to steal and drink a bottle of Gloria's tequila. Before they can take it, she swaps it out with water in order to them a lesson, leaving Luke and Manny suffering a placebo intoxication, after which she leads them to believe that the bottle of tequila had a deadly worm in it that they likely consumed. When Will says that the only way to kill the worm after it is consumed is by taking an ice bath, Luke and Manny share one. Gloria takes a photo of the boys in the bathtub together, threatening them to post it online if she ever catches them drinking again.

Andy (Adam Devine) wants to talk to Haley (Sarah Hyland) about the romantic feelings she expressed to him in "Closet? You'll Love It!", when he was in the hospital, which he heard on account of faking being asleep, but the situation is complicated by the presence of Haley’s new boyfriend Will (Nick Ballard). It is further complicated by a series of mishaps that leaves Andy and Haley in bed together and later, by a spilled drink that leaves Haley wearing only Andy’s shirt. However, Will never suspects that there is anything amiss between Andy and Haley, nor does he feel threatened by Andy, and actually asks him to help in composing a message for a card for Haley. However, once Will leaves, Haley struggles to read his handwriting. She asks Andy to read it to her and gets frustrated about how excessively attached to her Will is, after only two weeks of dating. Haley kisses Andy on the cheek before joining her family, leaving him both disappointed and hopeful.

Alex (Ariel Winter) finds out she has been accepted into Caltech, but her blasé attitude about this leads Claire to blame herself for not sufficiently praising Alex’s achievements because she has come to expect them from her. She resorts to overtly praising Alex in front of others, but this leaves Alex embarrassed and irritated. Jay later finds her with a bottle of tequila, the placebo bottle that Gloria swapped out earlier with water, in his new car in the garage. When confronted, Jay explains the bottle of water in the tequila bottle, commenting that drinking will not help her with her problems. Alex expresses worry about being the least intelligent person at her new college and talks about how scared she is. Jay reassures her that she will do great at college, and pointing to the bickering among the others, he says that one day when he is gone, she will be the leader that the family will need.

== Reception ==
=== Ratings ===
In its original American broadcast, "Grill, Interrupted" was watched by 9.43; up by 0.72 from the previous episode.

=== Reviews ===
David Kallison of The A.V. Club awarded the episode with a B+, saying that "Modern Family has no business being as good as it is. [The show] is on a tear of superb episodes lately, starting with the anti-Luddite ode, 'Connection Lost'. What makes this family different from others is the depth and heart the characters possess. The Dunphys et al. are more like, well, a real family. And that makes their schtick last longer". Kallison further went on to praise the season as a whole, saying "This season proves that sitcoms can survive on solid characters and solid jokes. "Grill, Interrupted" lives up to those expectations perfectly".

Ashley Bissette Sumerel of TV Fanatic rated the episode with 4.2/5, saying that this was the kind of episode she liked to see. Sumerel further went on to label the episode "intricate and fun", and also praised Luke, Manny and Gloria's subplot, by saying "In reality, this is a serious topic, and it's nice to see it being dealt with". She closed her review by stating "Overall, this is a really enjoyable, funny installment. It tries to do a LOT, but that's part of what makes Modern Family, well... Modern Family".

Lisa Fernandes of Next Projection rated the episode with 7.6/10, praising the scene between Alex and Jay as "lovely" saying that "Ed O'Neill acts the holy hell out of [it]". Fernandes summarizes her review by stating "Some good moments, the Jay/Alex pep talk and most of the Haley/Andy storyline salvage the episode".

The Christian Post praised the scene between Alex and Jay at the episode's close, saying "As they look at the bickering going on, it's clear that Jay thinks that Alex is more than capable of leading the family one day".
