= The Day We Almost Died =

- Modern Family episode
- Episode no.: Season 6 Episode 11
- Directed by: James Bagdonas
- Written by: Danny Zuker
- Production code: 6ARG13
- Original air date: January 7, 2015

Guest appearance
- Rob Riggle as Gil Thorpe

Episode chronology
← Previous "Haley's 21st Birthday"	Next → "The Big Guns"
- Modern Family season 6

"The Day We Almost Died" is the eleventh episode of the sixth season of the American sitcom Modern Family, and the series' 131st episode overall. It originally aired on January 7, 2015. The episode was written by Danny Zuker and directed by James Bagdonas.

== Plot ==
The whole Dunphy family, along with Manny (Rico Rodriguez), re-evaluate their lives when they have a near-death experience while going for breakfast and almost get hit by a truck.

Claire (Julie Bowen), who was arguing with Mitch (Jesse Tyler Ferguson) moments before the incident, decides that she has to stop being so controlling all the time and visits him at his work to apologize and take a walk with him. They go for roller skating and Claire forces Mitch to go through a dark tunnel to surpass his fear about it. Before they enter the tunnel they get separated and Mitch gets mugged. He comes out of the tunnel and demands from Claire her roller skates so he can go back to work for an important meeting.

Alex (Ariel Winter) realizes how much Haley (Sarah Hyland) loves her, since the moment of the "accident" Haley hugged her and said "I thought I almost lost you". The two of them spend the day together and Haley takes Alex for mustache waxing and to buy new clothes. Back at home, Alex discovers that Haley was actually talking to her phone when she said "I thought I almost lost you" and Alex gets mad at her.

Luke (Nolan Gould) decides to go through his bucket list after realizing how many things he is missing. He even missed his near-death experience because he was listening to music and not paying attention at the moment.

Phil (Ty Burrell) wants to stop being scared and takes action by first confronting Gil Thorpe (Rob Riggle) for stealing his clients. Cameron (Eric Stonestreet), who is with Phil at the moment, finds Phil's new behavior sexy and has no idea how to handle it, especially when Phil also confronts the salesman at the store for bringing Cameron the wrong color of washing machine. Phil manages to convince the salesman take back the wrong one and replace it with a new one in the right color. The new "feelings" of Cameron towards Phil disappear the moment Phil decides to take an alpaca home and it has to sit with Cameron in the back seat of the car.

Manny is afraid to get into a car again and Jay (Ed O'Neill) forces him to do it despite Gloria's (Sofía Vergara) objection. When Jay sees that having Manny in the back seat makes it worse, he decides that Manny will get over his fear only if he drives the car. Manny tries to do it but, he is still scared and when Gloria realizes that Manny not being able to drive in the future will be a big problem for her, she pretends that she sees the man who stole her phone and makes Manny chase him with the car. Manny is no longer afraid, but after the chasing, Jay and Mitch (who was on his way to work with the roller skates) have their own near-death experience. Jay gets out of the car to walk home while Mitch calls the salesman to demand the right color of washing machine since he has no idea that Phil has already fixed this problem. The Dunphys collectively realise they were acting crazy because they all thought they nearly lost each other, and Jay joins them for a group hug after his near-death while Manny was driving. Cameron find's Mitchell's new assertiveness sexy too until Mitchell starts sneezing from the alpaca hairs on Cameron's clothing, and both are then put off after the day's antics.

== Reception ==
=== Ratings ===
In its original American broadcast, "The Day We Almost Died" was watched by 9.29; down by 0.40 from the previous episode.

=== Reviews ===
"The Day We Almost Died" received positive reviews.

Joshua Alston from The A.V. Club awarded the episode an A rating praising the writing of Danny Zuker. "At least once a season, Modern Family tries something clever and outlandish and absolutely nails it. Last season, it was the delirious farce of "Las Vegas," and in season six, it looks like "The Day We Almost Died" is the overachiever."

Leigh Raines of TV Fanatic rated the episode with 4.5/5 stating that the "everyone reacts different to a near-death experience" was especially true on this episode.

Lisa Fernandes from Next Projection rated the episode with 8.7/10. "This one isn’t quite a car crash, but it’s not a smooth getaway, either. It is indeed a fun little adventure, however. Worth a record."
