= Three Turkeys =

- Modern Family episode
- Episode no.: Season 6 Episode 8
- Directed by: Beth McCarthy-Miller
- Written by: Jeffrey Richman
- Production code: 6ARG09
- Original air date: November 19, 2014

Guest appearance
- Nigella Lawson as herself

Episode chronology
← Previous "Queer Eyes, Full Hearts"	Next → "Strangers in the Night"
- Modern Family season 6

"Three Turkeys" is the eighth episode of the sixth season of the American sitcom Modern Family, and the series' 128th episode overall. It originally aired on November 19, 2014. The episode was written by Jeffrey Richman and directed by Beth McCarthy-Miller.

The Three Turkeys refer to Thanksgiving in the Dunphy household and the disasters that follow. This also includes Jay and Gloria's attempt to avoid Thanksgiving with their family and Lily, keeping Mitchell and Cameron occupied.

== Plot ==
Claire (Julie Bowen) decides to allow Phil (Ty Burrell) to be in charge for the Thanksgiving dinner this year, so Phil tries to cook while Luke (Nolan Gould) helps him. Phil also downloaded an app of Nigella Lawson to his phone, who talks to him and guides him on how to cook a turkey. Claire, even though she expressly left Phil in charge, does not trust him and secretly cooks her own turkey, keeping it in the garage in case Phil's cooking ends up being a disaster. Alex (Ariel Winter) finds out about it but agrees to cover Claire and not say anything to Phil. While in the garage playing with Phil's inventions, they accidentally blow up the fuse box and cut power to the house, so they decide to move the dinner to Jay (Ed O'Neill) and Gloria's (Sofía Vergara) house, since they are supposed to be abroad in Mexico.

In the meantime, Gloria and Jay are hiding in their house, letting everyone believe that they are in Mexico. Their trip was canceled at the last minute, but they did not say anything about it because they wanted to spend some time alone, away from the whole family. When the Dunphys get to the house, they try to stay hidden in the bedroom so the rest of the family will not find out about their lie.

Cameron (Eric Stonestreet) and Mitch (Jesse Tyler Ferguson) have some trouble making Lily (Aubrey Anderson-Emmons) understand that she cannot always do or have what she wants. Since Mitch is usually the one not allowing her to do things she likes, Lily sees him as the mean one. Mitch demands that Cameron do it for a change. When Lily gets ready for the dinner but does not wear the dress they picked for her, Cameron tries to explain her that she has to put it on. Lily agrees, but she puts it on top of the clothes she is already wearing. When they get to Jay and Gloria's, to show her that this is not right, they decide to wear some of Gloria's dresses over their own clothes. As they enter the bedroom, they force Jay and Gloria to hide once again. After Mitch and Cameron leave, Jay and Gloria decide that they cannot keep hiding and plan to tell everyone that they just came back early to surprise them.

Jay gets their suitcases and they get out of the house when they realize they left Joe in their bedroom and Jay forgot the turkey he had in the oven. He tells Gloria to retrieve it, but she unknowingly takes Phil's turkey instead of theirs, and places it in one of their suitcases. When Phil comes back to check on his turkey, he finds Jay's, which is poorly cooked. Believing it to be his, Phil begins panicking on how his turkey got so small. Jay and Gloria enter the house, pretending they had just arrived; Jay rushes upstairs with a pumpkin swaddled in a blanket, pretending it is a sleeping Joe. Phil worriedly begins offering the poorly cooked turkey, but Claire interferes by presenting her turkey, making Phil feel betrayed for not trusting him. When Luke opens the suitcase to find his birthday present from Mexico, he finds Phil's turkey instead. Phil recognizes the turkey and things get messed up since no one knows how they ended up having three turkeys. The mess-up makes Gloria and Jay admit that they were never in Mexico and they explain that the third turkey was theirs. When they decide to skip Thanksgiving due to everything that happened, Haley (Sarah Hyland) convinces them to not do that because they are family and if they have to skip a holiday, then they should skip Christmas. Haley later privately reveals that she already has plans to spend Christmas in Cabo.

== Reception ==
=== Ratings ===
In its original American broadcast, "Three Turkeys" was watched by 10.88; up by 1.05 from the previous episode.

=== Reviews ===
"Three Turkeys" received positive reviews.

Leigh Raines from TV Fanatic rated the episode with 4.5/5. "Phil and Luke took actually did pretty well in the kitchen. Phil might've even liked the experience a little too much, getting turned on by the Nigella Lawson cooking instructional."

Joshua Alston of The A.V. Club gave the episode a B− rating stating that the clockwork on the plots of the episode created a frantic farcical energy reminded of the Las Vegas episode but "[Three Turkeys] wasn’t nearly as successful as [Las Vegas] [...] "Turkeys” aims for the same vibe, and nearly achieves it, but is done in by the familiarity of the characters, which allows for far less options by which to assemble the comedy of errors effect. It certainly could have worked better, but it wasn’t a complete turkey."

Fourthmic gave a good review to the episode saying that it was another strong one of the season and that "[the episode] has seen the series return to the quality that we came to appreciate in the first couple of seasons."
