= Australia (Modern Family) =

- Modern Family episode
- Episode no.: Season 5 Episode 20
- Directed by: Steven Levitan
- Written by: Elaine Ko; Danny Zuker
- Production code: 5ARG21
- Original air date: April 23, 2014

Guest appearance
- Rhys Darby as Fergus Anderson

Episode chronology
← Previous "A Hard Jay's Night"	Next → "Sleeper"
- Modern Family season 5

"Australia" is the 20th episode of the fifth season of the American sitcom Modern Family, and the series' 116th overall. It was aired on April 23, 2014. The episode was written by Elaine Ko & Danny Zuker and directed by Steven Levitan. The episode is notable for its inclusion of Australian landmarks and points of interest. Each character in the episode explores Australia in their own way and encounter evolving attitudes and personal growth as they encounter unexpected obstacles during their visit. The episode garnered 9.59 million views upon its first broadcast and has received mixed reviews.

== Plot ==
The whole family travels to Australia where Phil Dunphy (Ty Burrell) was conceived (and where his great-grandfather was from) and he wants to connect to his late mother and his heritage by visiting the country.

Phil hires an Australian guide (Mark Coles Smith) to show them the land, however Jay (Ed O'Neill) and Claire (Julie Bowen) barely participate in the vacation because they want to work on a project for their work that will allow them to triumph over the "Closets Closets Closets Closets" company in a competition. They find different excuses to leave the others so they can finish it, something that makes Gloria (Sofía Vergara) and Phil mad. While Jay and Claire are busy, Gloria and Phil try to enjoy the country but after a number of "accidents" Gloria is not sure if she can keep Phil safe anymore. Phil gets stung by jellyfish, bitten by mosquitoes, has an allergic reaction after having a vegemite sandwich, and he even gets punched in the face by a kangaroo. Phil is left despondent believing Australia has rejected him, but is made to feel better when a local man shows off several scars explaining that Australia is nice to tourists but brutal against its own people.

Haley (Sarah Hyland) rejects a hot surfer who flirts with her because she believes that Australia's main export is hot surfers so she can not get the first one who appeared. She also says the same to Lily (Aubrey Anderson-Emmons) about buying a souvenir since her daddies gave her money to buy only one thing. So, the two of them along with Alex (Ariel Winter) spend the whole day watching souvenirs to find the perfect one.

Under the belief that Bondi Beach is a nudist beach, Luke (Nolan Gould) and Manny (Rico Rodriguez) want to spend the time at the beach so they can "admire" the topless women. They spot one and Luke runs into the water to try and talk to her but a strong wave pulls him under and causes him to lose his swim trunks. The topless woman sees that something happened and when she learns what it is, she offers to help him find his trunks saying that it will not be hard since the water is really clear, something that makes Luke panic.

Cam (Eric Stonestreet) and Mitch (Jesse Tyler Ferguson) leave the rest of the family because Cam had promised a "friend" who lives in Australia, Fergus (Rhys Darby), to have lunch with him when they would get there. Neither of them wants to do it but they do not have a choice. During the lunch they discover that Fergus has his own talk show and is famous in Australia. They immediately change their mind and want to spend more time with him and enjoy his life. The next day they ditch their family again because Fergus invited them to a party that Hugh Jackman is giving. Cam and Mitch get there but they only find Fergus had a fight with Hugh and he was left behind when the boat left dock. The three of them try to have fun together but Mitch and Cam just want to go back to Lily and the rest of the family. Heading back, their cab breaks down and the two are taken the rest of the way by a group of friendly bikers.

Gloria is furious with Jay and Claire ignoring the whole family to work and she starts screaming at Jay making him understand that it is better to have time with his family than trying to work. He then talks to Claire and they agree to enjoy the rest of their vacation with their family.

The family reunites and spends the rest of their vacation together, enjoying several activities including climbing the Sydney Harbour Bridge, scuba diving, and sightseeing.

== Reception ==
=== Ratings ===
In its original American broadcast, "Australia" was watched by 9.59 million; up by 0.59 from the previous episode.

In its Australian broadcast on Network Ten the episode received 1.05 million views and aired against The TV Week Logies and My Kitchen Rules, which rated highly; it was one of the network's biggest audiences all year. In the Australian broadcast, a 30-minute special aired before the episode, titled "An Aussie Adventure" with behind the scenes footage and interviews with the cast. It ranked sixth for the night.

=== Reviews ===
"Australia" received mixed reviews.

Leigh Raines of TV Fanatic rated the episode with 5/5. "I bet this was an incredible episode to film. The last part of the half hour with all the clips of their adventures really just seemed like we were watching the actors on a real life vacation. It must've been amazing!"

Madina Papadopoulos of Paste Magazine rated the episode with 5.4/10. "This week's episode, "Australia," left me underwhelmed in humor and a little overwhelmed with all the storylines that were going on. [...] the classic, magic number of storylines in television is three. This week Modern Family had six, and they definitely dropped a couple of balls."

Joshua Alston from The A.V. Club gave the episode a C−, saying that the script isn't a structural marvel but it’s quietly elegant and he compares the episode with the "Las Vegas" one: "Compared to "Las Vegas," which at the very least belongs on a shortlist of the season's best episodes, "Australia" doesn't have half the structural brio and perhaps even less of the jokes. "Las Vegas" was classic, cleverly executed sitcom with Sin City as its backdrop. "Australia" is Modern Family plus Australia."
