= Things Never Said =

- Directed by: Charles Murray
- Written by: Charles Murray
- Produced by: Brian “Skinny B” Lewis
- Starring: Shanola Hampton; Omari Hardwick; Elimu Nelson
- Edited by: Geofrey Hildrew
- Production company: Ohio Street Pictures
- Distributed by: Codeblack Films
- Release dates: April 2013 (Greater Cleveland Urban Film Festival); September 6, 2013 (limited)
- Country: United States
- Language: English

Things Never Said is a 2013 American drama film written and directed by Charles Murray and starring Shanola Hampton, Omari Hardwick and Elimu Nelson.

== Cast ==
- Shanola Hampton
- Omari Hardwick
- Elimu Nelson
- Michael Beach
- Tamala Jones
- Dorian Missick

== Release ==
The film premiered at the Greater Cleveland Urban Film Festival in April 2013. Codeblack Films acquired U.S. distribution rights to the film in June 2013. The film was released in theaters on September 6, 2013.

== Reception ==
The film has a 67% rating on Rotten Tomatoes. Christy Lemire of RogerEbert.com awarded the film two stars. Carrie Rickey of The Philadelphia Inquirer awarded the film two and a half stars out of four. Andrea Thompson of Patch graded the film a B+.
