= Haley's 21st Birthday =

- Modern Family episode
- Episode no.: Season 6 Episode 10
- Directed by: Alisa Statman
- Written by: Abraham Higginbotham
- Production code: 6ARG10
- Original air date: December 10, 2014

Guest appearances
- Raymond McAnally as Tony; Sunkrish Bala as Daryl

Episode chronology
← Previous "Strangers in the Night"	Next → "The Day We Almost Died"
- Modern Family season 6

"Haley's 21st Birthday" is the tenth episode of the sixth season of the American sitcom Modern Family, and the series' 130th episode overall. It originally aired on December 10, 2014. The episode was written by Abraham Higginbotham and directed by Alisa Statman.

The episode centers on Haley's 21st birthday. Claire, Gloria, Mitchell and Cameron take Haley to a bar so she can have her first drink, while Phil wants to buy her a car as a gift. Jay tries to help bring down the cost of the car using business negotiation tactics. Manny, Luke and Alex stay home to babysit Lily who asks them if they know how babies are made.

"Haley's 21st Birthday" received mixed reviews from the critics.

== Plot ==
Haley (Sarah Hyland) is celebrating her 21st birthday with her family. Haley, Claire (Julie Bowen), Gloria (Sofía Vergara), Mitchell (Jesse Tyler Ferguson) and Cameron (Eric Stonestreet) go to a bar where Haley can have her first drink. Claire tries all night to convince Haley to see her as a best friend who shares everything with her and not as her mom, while Mitchell and Cameron try to convince a group of bachelorettes that they are the cool gay guys.

Elsewhere, Phil (Ty Burrell) plans to buy a car as a gift for Haley and tries to make the deal with the salesman. Jay (Ed O'Neill) accompanies him and Jay interferes right before the paperwork is signed, telling him that they can get a better deal. Playing hardball, they go to another dealership, where Jay tries to make the best bargain possible but he only manages to get kicked out, leaving Phil desperate. Jay tells him that he managed to buy the first car Phil had in mind, but in a better deal. When Phil gets into the car with the salesman, it is revealed that Jay was unable to get a better deal but asked the salesman to say he did while he paid the difference.

Back in the bar, Haley wants to get a tattoo and Claire disagrees with the decision but she decides not to tell her no since all night she was saying that she would be supportive in everything that Haley wants to do. Gloria is excited with the idea and convinces Claire to also get a matching tattoo. Claire gets the tattoo, but Haley changes her mind and decides not to get one. Claire tries to convince her that she has to get one too, otherwise it will look like her tattoo is dedicated to her mother DeDe, but Phil arrives with the new car and Haley leaves.

Meanwhile, Alex (Ariel Winter), Luke (Nolan Gould) and Manny (Rico Rodriguez) stay home and babysit Lily (Aubrey Anderson-Emmons), who puts them in an awkward position when she starts asking them if they know how babies are made.

== Reception ==
=== Ratings ===
In its original American broadcast, "Haley's 21st Birthday" was watched by 9.69; up by 0.67 from the previous episode.

=== Reviews ===
"Haley's 21st Birthday" received mixed reviews.

Leigh Raines from TV Fanatic rated the episode with 5/5 saying that it marked the celebration of Haley's momentous birthday with her family.

Lisa Fernandes of Next Projection rated the episode with 9/10. "An uneven yet amusing episode. Great performances and relatable situations support the general enjoyability of the episode."

Joshua Alston from The A.V. Club gave the episode a C rating saying that the episode was "asking too much" from the audience to believe. "Modern Family can get away with a certain level of contrivance simply because its characters are so disparate. [...] While “Birthday” has peppery lines sprinkled throughout, it’s tough to focus on them when they’re deployed as part of stories that never manage to make much sense."
