= Patriot Games (Modern Family) =

- Modern Family episode
- Episode no.: Season 6 Episode 22
- Directed by: Alisa Statman
- Written by: Vali Chandrasekaran
- Production code: 6ARG22
- Original air date: May 6, 2015

Guest appearances
- Benjamin Bratt as Javier Delgado; Andrew Daly as Principal Brown; Suraj Partha as Sanjay; Anjali Bhimani as Nina Patel; Ajay Mehta as Vish Patel; Kevin Daniels as Longinus; Matthew Risch as Jotham; Maile Flanagan as Immigration Officer

Episode chronology
← Previous "Integrity"	Next → "Crying Out Loud"
- Modern Family season 6

"Patriot Games" is the twenty-second episode of the sixth season of the American sitcom Modern Family, and the series' 142nd episode overall. It originally aired on May 6, 2015. The episode was written by Vali Chandrasekaran, and directed by Alisa Statman.

In the episode, Phil, Claire and Alex get a call to meet Alex's principal, where they learn that she must settle for co-valedictorian with Sanjay, Alex's competition at school for many years. Gloria studies to become an American citizen, something that Jay supports but Javier (Manny's father) tries to prevent. Mitchell and Cameron join a protest against a restaurant they love, in order to prove to their friends that they are still very political about gay rights.

"Patriot Games" received positive reviews from the critics.

== Plot ==
Alex (Ariel Winter), Phil (Ty Burrell) and Claire (Julie Bowen) are called into Principal Brown's (Andrew Daly) office and they assume that the principal wants to announce to them that Alex is going to be the valedictorian of her class. Alex's rival though, Sanjay (Suraj Partha), also gets called with his parents and the principal announces them that they are going to be co-valedictorians, something that they refuse to accept. Alex and Sanjay convince the principal to let them compete over one last grade, for gym class, and Cameron (Eric Stonestreet), being the gym teacher, will decide which one deserves to be the valedictorian. One day before the competition, Sanjay goes to Alex's house and tells her that he likes her and that she is the reason he can attend college because she was always pushing him to study more and become better. Alex believes that he only said those things to distract her from winning the race but the next day, Sanjay forfeits the race to prove to her he was telling the truth and the two of them end up kissing in front of their parents.

Gloria (Sofía Vergara) studies to become an American citizen, something that Jay (Ed O'Neill) approves of and helps her. Javier (Benjamin Bratt), who is visiting to see Manny (Rico Rodriguez), disapproves of what Gloria is doing and he tries to prevent her from doing it by saying that she forgets and rejects her roots. After Gloria finds out that Jay wants her to become American citizen because he hates waiting in the long lines at the airport, she decides to abandon the idea. Jay talks to her and convinces her that the airport is actually not the reason he wants her to do it and Gloria takes the test eventually. She passes and officially becomes an American citizen.

Mitchell (Jesse Tyler Ferguson) and Cameron (Eric Stonestreet) are at a store with Lily (Aubrey Anderson-Emmons) buying things she needs for a school project. They run into Longinus (Kevin Daniels) and Jotham (Matthew Risch) who inform them that they are going to participate in a protest against a local restaurant that is against gay rights. When Longinus and Jotham accuse Cameron and Mitchell of not being very political after they adopted Lily, Cameron and Mitchell tell them that they still are and to prove it they will attend the protest too. They get to the restaurant but no one is there for the protest yet so they enter the restaurant. In reality, Cameron and Mitchell love to eat there and they sit to have lunch. On their way out they run into the protest and they join it without letting the rest of the protesters realize that they were actually in the restaurant having lunch. However, they were caught when the restaurant employees come out to hand them their leftovers, and Mitch's forgotten cellphone.

== Reception ==
=== Ratings ===
In its original American broadcast, "Patriot Games" was watched by 8.57; up by 0.57 from the previous episode.

=== Reviews ===
"Patriot Games" received positive reviews from critics.

Gwen Ihnat of The A.V. Club awarded the episode with a B rating saying that this week the show split its plots under the umbrella of patriotism. On Jay and Gloria's plot, Ihnat states: "It’s always valuable to see the chemistry between Jay and Gloria, as we remember why they’re together in the first place. Jay sold every one of his arguments, fake or not, about what it means to be in this country. It’s a fairly blatant message for a sitcom, but "Patriot Games" pulled this off in a nicely sentimental way, from teen romance to the culmination of a lifelong dream."

Ashley Bissette Sumerel of TV Fanatic rated the episode with 4.5/5 focusing her review on Alex's story and concluding: "So, [Alex and Sanjay] will end up being co-valedictorians after all, but I don't think that's the takeaway. Instead, the takeaway is a love interest for Alex, and I hope it goes somewhere further than this episode. It should, actually, complicate matters as the two head off to college."

Lisa Fernandes of Next Projection rated the episode with 7.5/10 stating that it combined some odd morals with some decent comedy and that Alex's plot saves the episode. "It’s not a tragically bad episode like last week’s, but it’s not very much better than the stuff that’s come before it. The generally charming Alex plot is what saves this one from the dung heap, and makes it worth recommending."
