= Valentine's Day 4: Twisted Sister =

- Modern Family episode
- Episode no.: Season 6 Episode 14
- Directed by: Fred Savage
- Written by: Jeffrey Richman
- Production code: 6ARG15
- Original air date: February 11, 2015

Guest appearances
- Stephanie Beatriz as Sonia; Roger Bart as Anders; Eve Brenner as Anders' mother

Episode chronology
← Previous "Rash Decisions"	Next → "Fight or Flight"
- Modern Family season 6

"Valentine's Day 4: Twisted Sister" is the fourteenth episode of the sixth season of the American sitcom Modern Family, and the series' 134th episode overall. It originally aired on February 11, 2015. The episode was written by Jeffrey Richman and directed by Fred Savage.

In the episode Phil and Claire reprise their roles as Juliana and Clive Bixby for Valentine's Day, but Claire realizes that Phil is truly in love with Juliana. Gloria's sister Sonia is back in town and Gloria tries to fix their relationship, until Sonia hits on Jay. Mitchell and Cameron visit their friend Anders to give him a wedding present, but complications arise when they learn that Anders' husband has left him.

"Valentine's Day 4: Twisted Sister" received positive reviews from the critics.

== Plot ==
It is Valentine's Day and Phil (Ty Burrell) wants to reprise the roles of Juliana and Clive Bixby with Claire (Julie Bowen) as they always do the last few years. Even though Claire seems like she is in no mood for role playing this time, she surprises him as Juliana at the bar Phil was supposed to meet Claire and the two of them, Phil and Juliana, have a great time together. Claire realizes that Phil is in love with Juliana and on their way home, she decides to take Juliana down and get her husband back.

Gloria's (Sofía Vergara) sister Sonia (Stephanie Beatriz) is in town and Gloria does everything to make her feel welcome and to fix their relationship. She even arranges for all three of them, herself, Sonia and Jay (Ed O'Neill), to have dinner together even if it is Valentine's Day. When Jay sees Sonia being sad, he gives her the present he bought for Stella telling her that he bought it for her. Sonia misunderstands his intentions and thinking that Jay wants to be with her she starts hitting on him. Jay tries to tell Gloria but Gloria thinks he is crazy. After a small accident where Gloria sprains her ankle, Jay and Sonia are left to have dinner alone. Manny (Rico Rodriguez) also understands that Sonia is acting weird and he thinks that she wants to kill him and Gloria so she can have Jay. Gloria is furious about the accusations towards her sister but when Sonia attacks Jay in the bedroom, the two of them start fighting all over again over Jay.

Mitchell (Jesse Tyler Ferguson) and Cameron (Eric Stonestreet) bought a wedding present for their friends Anders (Roger Bart) and Cooper and they visit them to give it to them. The problem is that they like the present so much that they want to keep it. When they get to their friends' house, they find out that Cooper left Anders and filed for divorce, so they decide to take their gift back. Their back and forth attempts to get it back lead them to finally leave with their present for Anders and Cooper as well as the present their friends bought them for their wedding.

== Reception ==
=== Ratings ===
In its original American broadcast, "Valentine's Day 4: Twisted Sister" was watched by 9.77; down by 0.10 from the previous episode.

=== Reviews ===
"Valentine's Day 4: Twisted Sister" received positive reviews.

Gwen Ihnat of The A.V. Club awarded the episode with a B+ rating stating that making a Valentine's Day episode for a fourth time is tough and Modern Family brought some guests in for help. "Speaking of different from usual fare, there was an extraordinarily high percentage of LOL lines this episode. Credit should be thrown to longtime sitcom scribe Jeffrey Richman, and director Fred Savage, a former sitcom star himself. Both these vets have a familiarity with the genre that breeds confidence, which undoubtedly helped lead this episode toward its success rate."

Leigh Raines from TV Fanatic rated the episode with 4.5/5. "Definitely not the best Valentine's Day episode of Modern Family, but definitely not the worst either. Overall, a good laugh and put a smile on my face."

Lisa Fernandes of Next Projection rated the episode with 8.3/10 saying that "Arrows fly all over during this episode, but it’s ultimately a mixed bag from start to finish." Fernandes added to her review that Phil and Claire had the best and most charming plot.
