= Strangers in the Night (Modern Family) =

- Modern Family episode
- Episode no.: Season 6 Episode 9
- Directed by: Fred Savage
- Written by: Chuck Tatham
- Production code: 6ARG07
- Original air date: December 3, 2014

Guest appearances
- Kristen Johnston as Brenda; John Karna as Alec

Episode chronology
← Previous "Three Turkeys"	Next → "Haley's 21st Birthday"
- Modern Family season 6

"Strangers in the Night" is the ninth episode of the sixth season of the American sitcom Modern Family, and the series' 129th episode overall. It originally aired on December 3, 2014. The episode was written by Chuck Tatham and directed by Fred Savage.

== Plot ==
Jay (Ed O'Neill) wants to attend a dog's birthday party (a Bark Mitzvah) with Stella (Brigitte) and he also takes Gloria (Sofía Vergara) with him, while Manny (Rico Rodriguez) stays home to baby-sit Joe (Pierce Wallace). Gloria, who gets along with dogs very poorly, tells Jay that she is unable to stay any longer at the party and leaves. Back at home, Manny convinces her that she has to go back, in order to show Jay that she cares about what he loves, and because Jay has agreed to accompany her to the Colombian picnic with her friends the following day. When Jay sees Gloria coming back, he gets mad at Manny and tells him that his plan was for Gloria to leave so he could use it as an excuse to skip the picnic. The following day, when Gloria and Jay get ready to leave, Jay thinks that Manny convinced Gloria to go back on purpose so he could stay home alone and finally watch a movie he wanted to see, however Manny had no intention of manipulating events as Jay now suspects he did.

Alex (Ariel Winter) tells everyone that she has a boyfriend, Alec (John Karna), and while Phil (Ty Burrell) is happy with the news, Claire (Julie Bowen) and Haley (Sarah Hyland) are convinced that Alex is lying and the boyfriend is imaginary. To prove them wrong, Phil says he will ask Alex to invite her boyfriend to the house. When Alex says she is unable do so because Alec broke up with her and shortly afterwards says she found a new boyfriend, Phil starts to believe that Claire and Haley might be right. Eventually the new boyfriend (Carlito Olivero) arrives to pick Alex up for a date and they know that she was telling the truth.

Brenda (Kristen Johnston), a co-worker of Mitch's (Jesse Tyler Ferguson) gets a divorce and wants someone to talk to. Mitch tries to avoid her, especially when she asks him to stay at his and Cameron's (Eric Stonestreet) place for the night, but Cameron convinces him to be kind now that Brenda needs him, and to let her stay with them overnight. Back at home, the three of them seem to get along well, until Brenda moves to sit on their new white couch while drinking wine and later on wants to sleep on it while wearing a green beauty mask on her face. Mitch and Cameron let her sleep on their bed while they sleep on the living room floor, but Brenda ends up sleeping on the couch anyway.

== Reception ==
=== Ratings ===
In its original American broadcast, "Strangers in the Night" was watched by 9.02; down by 1.86 from the previous episode.

=== Reviews ===
"Strangers in the Night" received mixed reviews.

Joshua Alston from The A.V. Club gave the episode a B+ rating saying that the episode showed "how well the show can work when it’s plugging its characters into not only rhythmically familiar situations, but actual plots deployed on sitcoms past."

Lisa Fernandes of Next Projection rated the episode with 7.6/10 saying that Jay and Gloria's plot was amusing, the Dunphys' one all over the place while Kristin Johnston's guest appearance was completely wasted. ""Strangers in the Night" looks great on paper. That's the problem – it works well as a comedic premise but never seems to take off in the execution. While the performances are fairly strong, they're defeated by plots that abruptly dead-end in a confusing mess, minus moral and message but also without rhyme, reason or sense. It's an all right outing, but could still bit better with more polish."

Leigh Raines from TV Fanatic rated the episode with 3/5 stating that she did not "fall in love" with this episode and that "it was lacking".
