= Rash Decisions =

- Modern Family episode
- Episode no.: Season 6 Episode 13
- Directed by: Jim Hensz
- Story by: Anthony Lombardo; Clint McCray
- Teleplay by: Daisy Gardner
- Production code: 6ARG16
- Original air date: February 4, 2015

Guest appearances
- Adam Devine as Andy; Aya Cash as Vanessa; Chasty Ballesteros as Lucy

Episode chronology
← Previous "The Big Guns"	Next → "Valentine's Day 4: Twisted Sister"
- Modern Family season 6

"Rash Decisions" is the thirteenth episode of the sixth season of the American sitcom Modern Family, and the series' 133rd episode overall. It originally aired on February 4, 2015. The episode's story is by Anthony Lombardo & Clint McCray while the teleplay belongs to Daisy Gardner. It was directed by Jim Hensz.

In the episode, Gloria discovers an allergic rash on Joe and with the thought that he might be allergic to Stella, she forces Jay to take the dog away for a week. Jay takes Stella to Cameron and Mitchell's house where Cameron gets attached to her while Mitchell decides to work a few days at Jay's company and this time he plans to leave his snob self behind so he will be likable to the employees. In the meantime, Luke wants to get some distance from Phil now that he is a teenager and Phil starts to hang-out with Andy, something that Luke does not like while Alex tries to prepare for an interview with Princeton University.

"Rash Decisions" received mixed reviews from the critics.

== Plot ==
Mitchell (Jesse Tyler Ferguson) begins to work at Jay's (Ed O'Neill) company along with Claire for few days and he decides to behave as best as possible leaving his snob personality so he will be likable. This seems to work and everybody likes him in comparison to Claire and her relationship with her co-workers. Claire believes they like her but through Mitchell she realizes that they only see her as their boss and not as a friend. When Jay gives Claire a list of things she has to say to the employees that will insult them and she does not feel well to do, Mitchell takes the list and does it himself not caring if everyone starts disliking him again.

In the meantime, Jay returns home with Stella and Gloria (Sofia Vergara) informs him that Joe is allergic to something (probably Stella) and they have to keep them separated for a week to see if he is indeed allergic to the dog. Though he loves Stella, Jay has no choice but to take her away from home till they know the truth about Joe's allergic rash. Stella stays at Cameron (Eric Stonestreet) and Mitchell's home even though Cameron is afraid that Lily (Aubrey Anderson-Emmons) might get attached to her. Later, Jay discovers that Joe's rash was caused by Gloria's new face cream and he goes to get Stella back making Cameron cry since he is the one who got attached to Stella and not Lily, who is happy that Stella is finally going.

Luke (Nolan Gould) decides to spend more time with his friends rather than with Phil (Ty Burrell). This forces Phil to hang-out more with Andy (Adam DeVine) who is now also his assistant at work and the two of them start doing things Phil used to do with Luke. Luke seeing his dad spending so much time with Andy ignoring him, makes him feel excluded and replaced and tries to "win" his dad back. He finally confronts Phil telling him that the fact he refuses to practice an activity with his father does not mean that he has to be replaced. Phil explains that he will never replace his son and the two hug.

Alex (Ariel Winter) has an interview with a Princeton recruiter named Vanessa (Aya Cash) and she tries to prepare for it. Haley (Sarah Hyland) has to drive her to the interview and in the car, she does not stop talking on the phone with her friends saying the same story over and over again. This gets on Alex's nerves who tries to concentrate in order to make a good impression at the interview. However, when she arrives there she overhears Vanessa complaining about her candidates' lack of personality and Alex decides to imitate her older sister and even "steal" Haley's story, saving her from an awkward situation.

== Reception ==
=== Ratings ===
In its original American broadcast, "Rash Decisions" was watched by 9.87; up by 0.43 from the previous episode.

=== Reviews ===
"Rash Decisions" received mixed reviews.

Gwen Ihnat of The A.V. Club awarded the episode with a B grade stating "It’s always valuable to see a different side of a character who, at this point, we believe we know pretty well". Ihnat also praised Sarah Hyland's performance, labeling her the "Performer of the Week" and saying "It’s hard to picture a time when this wouldn’t be Sarah Hyland, but Haley continues to be just a whirlwind of delight".

Leigh Raines from TV Fanatic rated the episode with a perfect 5/5, saying "...that's the beauty of Modern Family: it's relatable to so many people". They closed their review by labeling the episode as "a great return episode after a little hiatus".

Lisa Fernandes of Next Projection rated the episode with 7.6/10 saying "This week, the show focuses in on what works better: simple comedy that interconnects the generations. It still feels bland but at least it scares up a laugh or two in the process. [...] The result is an episode that draws a shrug from the unlucky viewer. Modern Family once created strong buzz and gave us strong, relatable characters we loved (and sometimes loved to hate). Now it feels like it’s churning through the motions, having run out of anything useful to say about them."

Nora Williamson from TV and Film Review gave a mixed review to the episode saying that "...[the episode] had a few good moments, but otherwise I thought the episode could have been a lot funnier. I also don’t like it when the story lines are quite separate. I know that the three families can’t spend every episode together, but when they do, that is when Modern Family is at its best. [...] "Rash Decisions" definitely has some witty lines and funny moments but I just know that Modern Family can do so much better. I am hoping for a stronger episode next week that will maybe bring the whole family together."
