= Other People's Children (Modern Family) =

- Modern Family episode
- Episode no.: Season 5 Episode 17
- Directed by: Jim Hensz
- Written by: Megan Ganz
- Production code: 5ARG17
- Original air date: March 12, 2014

Guest appearance
- Adam DeVine as Andy

Episode chronology
← Previous "Spring-a-Ding-Fling"	Next → "Las Vegas"
- Modern Family season 5

"Other People's Children" is the 17th episode of the fifth season of the American sitcom Modern Family, and the series' 113th overall. It was aired on March 12, 2014. The episode was written by Megan Ganz and directed by Jim Hensz. As the episode's title suggests, the theme of the episode is sharing experiences with the children of others and the importance of removing oneself from his or her comfort zone.

== Plot ==
Cam (Eric Stonestreet) and Mitch (Jesse Tyler Ferguson) take Manny (Rico Rodriguez) and Alex (Ariel Winter) to a modern art museum. Cam has studied the exhibit at home so he will be prepared for the day but when they get there he finds out that the subject he had studied was temporary, making him feel the dumbest of the group. He tries to find a way to leave and he finally admits the truth to Mitch and leaves in the middle of the tour. Mitch follows him a little later and then Manny. Alex is the last to give up. They decide to take a meal but after Alex accidentally spreads mustard on her shirt, Cam decides to compare her to Kandinsky which leads his niece to attack him with mustard.

Gloria (Sofía Vergara) and Claire (Julie Bowen) take Lily (Aubrey Anderson-Emmons) to buy a flower girl dress for her daddies' wedding. They take her to a store with classic dresses but Lily wants to wear a princess dress she saw in another store. While being there, Claire tells Gloria that she did not wear a wedding dress at her wedding and Gloria makes her try one on. Claire tries on a dress and while the two women talk about it, Lily disappears and they start searching for her in the entire Mall. They find her wearing the princess dress she had seen earlier and they decide to call Cam and Mitch to ask them if they are fine with Lily not wearing a classic flower girl dress because Lily looks so happy with the princess one.

Phil (Ty Burrell) offers to help Andy (Adam DeVine) make a special gift for his girlfriend. They go to Phil's house and set up a scenery with green screen so Phil can shoot Andy saying and doing special things and then, with computer programs, add the necessary backgrounds. Haley (Sarah Hyland) is there watching them while waiting for her date to pick her up and thinks that what they do is stupid but she ends up helping them in one of the scenes. Her date is revealed to be mean and does not apologize for being late. Haley dumps him and changes her mind about Andy saying that he is sweet but she freaks out as Alex notices that he is somewhat like Phil.

Jay (Ed O'Neill) gets to spend the day with Luke (Nolan Gould) and tries to teach him how to use tools and do some basic woodworking. They talk about girls and Jay tries to tell him in what ways to impress the ninth grade girls. He finally gives him some tools and decides to give advice to his son Joe.

== Reception ==
=== Ratings ===
In its original American broadcast, "Other People's Children" was watched by 9.39 million; up by 0.17 from the previous episode.

=== Reviews ===
"Other People's Children" received positive reviews.

Joshua Alston from The A.V. Club gave a B+ rating to the episode, saying that although it probably had potential to be funnier, it was still a solid episode of television. "“Other People’s Children” is a Modern Family episode that makes me suspect this show has been better and more consistent than many people, myself included, give it credit for. Not because it's a superlative episode on its own merits, but because it suggests another narrative around how the show got from where it started to where it is."

Madina Papdopoulos of Paste Magazine rated the episode with 7.5/10 saying it was sweet and felt fresh. "In an episode that was more touching than funny, characters of different generations are paired together, allowing for rituals, perspectives, and talents to be passed on."

Dani Langlie of Starpulse rated the episode with 9/10 while Leigh Raines of TV Fanatic rated it with 4/5.
