= Fight or Flight (Modern Family) =

- Modern Family episode
- Episode no.: Season 6 Episode 15
- Directed by: Steven Levitan
- Written by: Abraham Higginbotham
- Production code: 6ARG18
- Original air date: February 18, 2015

Guest appearances
- Nathan Lane as Pepper Saltzman; Elizabeth Banks as Sal; Christian Barrillas as Ronaldo; Penn Jillette as Edward Legrand; Lauren Robertson as Jillian; Natasha Leggero as Dana; Matthew Risch as Jotham; Kevin Daniels as Longinus; Kevin Cahoon as John-John

Episode chronology
← Previous "Valentine's Day 4: Twisted Sister"	Next → "Connection Lost"
- Modern Family season 6

"Fight or Flight" is the fifteenth episode of the sixth season of the American sitcom Modern Family, and the series' 135th episode overall. It originally aired on February 18, 2015. The episode was written by Abraham Higginbotham and directed by Steven Levitan.

In the episode, Mitchell and Cameron organize a baby shower for Sal, who then seems to abandon her son with them. Mitchell and Cameron compete with Pepper and Ronaldo over adopting a child. Manny deals with a bully at cooking class, and Gloria insists that Jay teach Manny how to fight back. Claire has a bad experience with Phil at his college cheerleaders reunion weekend, so she dumps him to move to the single First Class seat offered on their flight home. When Alex and Haley find out that Luke likes a new girl, they totally takeover his text message break up with the girl he was already seeing, confident they can spare the girl's feelings.

"Fight or Flight" received mixed reviews from the critics, although many critics praised Elizabeth Banks' performance.

== Plot ==
Mitchell (Jesse Tyler Ferguson) and Cameron (Eric Stonestreet) organize a baby shower for Sal (Elizabeth Banks) with Pepper (Nathan Lane) and Ronaldo's (Christian Barrillas) help. However, they are surprised when they discover that Sal is now a teetotaler who actually cares about her son, Sammy. Though they enjoy it at first, Sal leaves the baby shower, leaving Sammy behind and the two couples believe that Sal abandoned her son. Mitchell and Cameron start arguing with Pepper and Ronaldo over Sammy since both couples want to adopt him. Sal finally returns to let them know that she would never abandon her son and informs them that she went to see Sammy's dad who is actually a hockey player for the Chicago Blackhawks and was unaware of Sammy's existence.

Claire (Julie Bowen) reluctantly agrees to attend Phil's (Ty Burrell) cheerleader friends reunion during a weekend. On their flight home, she takes the only first class seat while Phil lands in economy class. Things take an unexpected turn as Claire realizes that Dana (Natasha Leggero), the woman she is sitting with, is actually a loud and obnoxious bigot, while Phil enjoys his time with a magician named Edward Legrand (Penn Jillette) and a masseuse named Jillian (Lauren Robertson). Claire asks Phil to switch seats but Phil avoids it by lying that he is having a terrible time himself with the people who sit next to him. Claire discovers the truth and the two of them end up fighting with Claire confessing how terrible was the weekend for her and the sacrifice she made for Phil. After Claire's confession, Phil accepts to switch his seat and let Claire have some peace and quiet.

In the meantime, Jay (Ed O'Neill) and Gloria (Sofia Vergara) finally let Manny (Rico Rodriguez) join cooking classes. However, a fellow student named Gideon (Garrett Boyd) always plays pranks on him, which gets on his nerves. Gloria forces Jay to teach Manny some self-defense notions in order to stand up for himself. As Manny manages to attack Gideon, it turns out that Gideon's bad attitude is actually due to his parents' divorce and that he was trying to apologize and be nice to Manny the moment Manny attacked him. Manny feels bad about it but he is expelled from the cooking lessons even though he apologizes. Manny and Jay realize that Gloria is the actual tyrant in their lives as she obliged them to practice violence without understanding someone's real motivations and they decide to face her when they get back home.

Luke (Nolan Gould) decides to ask Alex (Ariel Winter) and Haley's (Sarah Hyland) advice since he is attracted to a girl. When they ask him about the girl he is in a relationship with, he says that he never broke up with her because he is unable to find a way to tell her without hurting her and that she will finally realize it on her own. Alex and Haley disagree with his decision, and using his phone, they text the girl in a polite way of breaking up only to get a rude answer back. The girls take it personally and they start texting with the girl while Luke enjoys the fact that they are the ones who look mean and not him, since they are the ones who are sending the texts.

== Reception ==
=== Ratings ===
In its original American broadcast, "Fight or Flight" was watched by 8.80; down by 0.93 from the previous episode.

=== Reviews ===
"Fight or Flight" received mixed reviews, with Elizabeth Banks receiving acclaim.

Gwen Ihnat from The A.V. Club awarded the episode with a B− rating. "The show’s last really good episode, "The Day We Almost Died," integrated all three families, and this combustible energy has been missing lately with these Cam-Mitch/Gloria-Jay/Phil-Claire set ups." Ihnat closes her review saying that most of the episode's four plotlines reach emotionally satisfying conclusions and these solid separations still chop up the episodic flow overall.

Lisa Fernandes of Next Projection rated the episode with 7.5/10 stating that the show decided for the last episodes to give each couple a plot and not having the whole family together. "This new decision has resulted in typically four spotlight stories in an episode, and thus has resulted in tales that come off as unevenly thought-out, with one segment usually standing head and shoulders above the others in terms of quality."

=== Award nominations ===
Elizabeth Banks was nominated for the Primetime Emmy Award for Outstanding Guest Actress in a Comedy Series for her performance in the episode.
