= Crying Out Loud =

- Modern Family episode
- Episode no.: Season 6 Episode 23
- Directed by: Ryan Case
- Written by: Megan Ganz; Stephen Lloyd; Chuck Tatham
- Production code: 6ARG23
- Original air date: May 13, 2015

Guest appearance
- Lexi Dibenedetto as Kylie

Episode chronology
| ← Previous "Patriot Games" | Next → "American Skyper" |
- Modern Family season 6

"Crying Out Loud" is the twenty-third episode of the sixth season of the American sitcom Modern Family, and the series' 143rd episode overall. It originally aired on May 13, 2015. The episode was written by Megan Ganz, Stephen Lloyd & Chuck Tathum, and directed by Ryan Case.

In the episode, Claire is offered a new job but she rejects it since she believes that her father will not want her to take it and leave his company. Luke and Phil, along with Haley, "kidnap" Alex for her Senior Ditch Day after her not wanting to participate. Cameron and Mitchell believe that Lily is incapable of showing her feelings and worry about it, while Gloria does not like Manny's new girlfriend, Kylie, and tries everything to make Manny break up with her.

"Crying Out Loud" received positive reviews from critics.

== Plot ==
It is Alex's (Ariel Winter) Senior Ditch Day, but she has no desire to make plans for the special day. Phil (Ty Burrell) asks her along with Haley (Sarah Hyland), to join him in the car because Luke (Nolan Gould) was injured and he was at the hospital. In the car, they realize that Phil tricked them so they - and especially Alex - can celebrate the day. On their way out, Phil drives past an old theater that he helped build many years ago and now it is about to be demolished. Upon entering, Phil finds a slab of cement with Haley's and Alex's footprints. Phil and Luke attempt to take the cement home with them, while Haley and Alex argue. Haley and Alex then watch Phil and Luke humorously repeatedly fail to remove the cement, and Haley reveals that she is worried Alex will not contact her after she leaves for college. Alex then implies that she has learnt a lot about life from Haley over the years, and tells her she would never forget to stay in touch with her sister.

Gloria (Sofía Vergara) is unimpressed with Manny's (Rico Rodriguez) new girlfriend, Kylie (Lexi Dibenedetto), and uses his sudden memory loss after an operation to trick him into believing Kylie never showed up to be by his side. Gloria does everything she can so Manny will not understand that she is lying to him and that Kylie was with him almost all day but she fails when Manny sees a picture of him and Kylie on his phone with the two of them sitting on the couch. Gloria tries to explain why she did what she did and that makes Manny realize that his new girlfriend is a lot like Gloria. Feeling now that he is dating his mother, he finds it disgusting and wants to break up with her. The idea that Kylie is like her, makes Gloria temporarily change her mind about her since if that is true then she can be sure that Kylie will take care of him. Gloria eventually understands and accepts that Manny will grow up and find a woman of his own and that she should not be so overly protective of him.

Claire (Julie Bowen) is offered a new job by a hotel chain which she is unsure whether to accept. Whilst she wants the job, she is turning it down because she is worried that her leaving the company will upset her father, Jay (Ed O'Neill). When she tells Jay about the offer, Jay seems to not care if Claire will accept or not, something that makes her call the company back and ask for more time to think about the offer. Then, she sees Jay crying while holding a picture of hers and she thinks that Jay is indeed upset and turns down the job again. After discussing the situation with Jay, who tells her that they called him from the other company telling him about her changing her mind all the time, he ultimately reveals that he does not want her to leave. After an emotional speech and calling her by her childhood nickname, he makes Claire too emotionally agree to stay at Jay's firm where she feels she belongs.

Cameron (Eric Stonestreet) and Mitchell (Jesse Tyler Ferguson) are worried about Lily's (Aubrey Anderson-Emmons) inability to show feelings. Mitchell, believing that this is his fault because he does not show emotion often, watches The Bridges of Madison County and plans to be crying when Lily arrives home. After telling Cameron about his plan, Cameron gets emotional that a movie about being trapped in a loveless marriage is the only thing that makes Mitchell cry. Cameron starts crying while Mitchell stops just in time that Lily gets home from school. Mitchell realizes that Lily was desensitized because Cameron cries too frequently. They decide to talk to Lily and during their discussion it is proven that Lily has feelings and gets upset with the thought that her daddies might get sick but not getting well.

== Reception ==
=== Ratings ===
In its original American broadcast, "Crying Out Loud" was watched by 8.13; down by 0.44 from the previous episode.

=== Reviews ===
"Crying Out Loud" received highly positive reviews from critics, with some labeling it the best episode of the season and praising the episode's emotional script and the physical comedy between Phil and Luke behind the screen.

Gwen Ihnat of The A.V. Club praised the episode, awarding it an A− grade. She praised the emotional scene between Haley and Alex as well as the Phil/Luke sequence, stating "This effective bit even achieved a larger purpose: bringing the girls together, and fulfilling Phil’s desire to hang out with the kids again, even for a single ditch day. Phil realizes that it doesn’t matter if the theater is torn down, because, as he describes the girls’ relationship in a three-word tear-inducing line to the camera: 'I made that'". She ultimately summarized her review by saying: "An inventive comic sequence heightens an emotional episode".

Ashley Bissette Sumerel of TV Fanatic also enjoyed the episode, awarding it a 3.7/5, stating "We're getting all emotional over here!". She also praised the Haley and Alex sequence, saying "Their moment in this episode is particularly poignant". She further went on to label the Phil/Luke sequence as "one of [her] favorite scenes this season".

Lisa Fernandes of Next Projection also praised the episode, awarding it a score of 9.9/10, deemed by the website as "masterful". She also praised the Haley/Alex dialogue and Phil/Luke sequence, saying "The strongest storyline belongs to Alex and Haley, providing some heart-tugging moments of sisterly togetherness. The final scene between the girls is beautifully thought out and constructed and plays over an interesting bit of shadow play enacted by Phil and Luke". She closed her review by labeling the episode as "Flat out the best episode of the season".
