= Spring Break (Modern Family) =

- Modern Family episode
- Episode no.: Season 6 Episode 18
- Directed by: Gail Mancuso
- Written by: Paul Corrigan; Brad Walsh
- Production code: 6ARG17
- Original air date: March 25, 2015

Guest appearances
- Will Sasso as Senor Kaplan; Alyson Reed as Angela; Aubree Young as Sydney

Episode chronology
| ← Previous "Closet? You'll Love It!" | Next → "Grill, Interrupted" |
- Modern Family season 6

"Spring Break" is the eighteenth episode of the sixth season of the American sitcom Modern Family, and the series' 138th episode overall. It originally aired on March 25, 2015. The episode was written by Paul Corrigan & Brad Walsh, and directed by Gail Mancuso.

In the episode, Alex anxiously checks her e-mails for her college acceptance, that Claire sends her to an outdoor music festival with Haley. Phil is hurt when Luke begins to outperform him in every activity they practice together. When Mitchell decides that Lily needs to be "rescued" from camp, Jay goes with him so he can smoke. Gloria accompanies Cameron to his school's talent show, where Cameron is competing with teacher Senor Kaplan about which of them will perform "Memories".

"Spring Break" received positive reviews from the critics.

== Plot ==
It is Spring Break and Alex (Ariel Winter) is busy checking her e-mails to see if Harvard had accepted her. Under Claire's (Julie Bowen) instructions, Alex goes with Haley (Sarah Hyland) to a music festival so she can relax a little and take her mind off of colleges. After Haley gets Alex drunk, Haley is on the phone with Claire learning that Alex did not get accepted to Harvard and she understands why Alex behaves so weird outside the fact that she is also drunk. Haley talks to Alex, and manages to convince her to put things to perspective. Returning home, Alex looks better and admits that Haley made her proud of herself while heading to her room rejecting Claire's help.

Phil (Ty Burrell) decides to spend time with his son. However, Luke (Nolan Gould) begins to outperform his dad in every activity they practice together, like playing the banjo and trampolining. When Claire gets excited about how fast Luke learns to play the banjo and how good he is at trampolining, Phil's feelings get hurt. Later on, Phil finds a bra under Luke's pillow and berates him as he is still "a kid who lives under his Dad's roof, and should follow his rules". While Phil is yelling at Luke, an accident with the banjo injures Luke in the eye, and Phil has to escort him to the hospital. Phil apologizes for his behavior, which Luke accepts and reveals that the bra actually belongs to him because he has trouble un-doing it on girls and he wants to practice.

Jay (Ed O'Neill) and Gloria (Sofia Vergara) try to give up one of their bad habits that annoy each other. Gloria has to stop watching her soap operas while Jay has to quit smoking. Jay gets the opportunity to leave the house and smoke when Mitchell (Jesse Tyler Ferguson) believes that Lily (Aubrey Anderson-Emmons) is miserable at her scout camp and decides to pick her up. Jay goes with him and on their way there, they disagree on the fact that parents should always be there for their kids as Mitchell believes, while Jay supports that children have to learn to be independent. When they arrive at the camp, Mitchell realizes that he was wrong and that Lily enjoys her time there. He tries to apologize by narrating a scary story he heard during the time he was at camp but fails until the moment the scouts see Jay in the woods, who they mistakenly believe is the ghost from Mitchell's story.

Back in town, Cameron (Eric Stonestreet) has to participate in a talent show that his school is organizing, and Gloria accompanies him. At the talent show, Cameron meets Senor Kaplan (Will Sasso) and begrudgingly lets him sing his song. However, after an accident, Cameron is wrongly blamed by the others who think that he deliberately injured Senor Kaplan in order to take his place. Cameron feels bad knowing what everyone believes he did and his performance is not good. After the performance, Kaplan reveals to Gloria that he was the one responsible for the accident because he knew he could not perform the song, unaware that Gloria had turned his microphone on in order to reveal the truth and help Cameron. When everyone hears of Kaplan's plan, they turn their favor and Cameron fights him, much to Gloria's pleasure as she finally found a real soap opera to watch without commercial breaks.

== Reception ==
=== Ratings ===
The episode was watched by an audience of 8.71 million people, down by 0.90 from the previous episode.

=== Reviews ===
"Spring Break" received positive reviews from the critics.

Gwen Ihnat of The A.V. Club awarded the episode a B, saying that "The show fares better with less chaos, more insight". She also praised the various character pairings, stating "Random pairings of our [Modern Family] players like Cam & Gloria and Mitch & Jay are appreciated".

Ashley Bissette Sumerel of TV Fanatic rated the episode with 4.2/5, stating that her "favorite thing about [the episode] is the interaction between Haley and Alex". She also praised the Phil and Luke's storyline, saying that Phil's confession to Luke was "both endearing and hilarious...perfect deadpan comedy".
