= Integrity (Modern Family) =

- Modern Family episode
- Episode no.: Season 6 Episode 21
- Directed by: Chris Koch
- Written by: Stephen Lloyd; Chuck Tatham
- Production code: 6ARG19
- Original air date: April 29, 2015

Guest appearances
- Michael Urie as Gavin Sinclair; Andrew Daly as Principal Brown

Episode chronology
← Previous "Knock 'Em Down"	Next → "Patriot Games"
- Modern Family season 6

"Integrity" is the twenty-first episode of the sixth season of the American sitcom Modern Family, and the series' 141st episode overall. It originally aired on April 29, 2015. The episode was written by Stephen Lloyd & Chuck Tatham, and directed by Chris Koch.

In the episode, Claire tries to bribe the school Principal to give Luke an award as she thinks that Luke's bad mood is because Alex gets all the awards each year. Luke and Manny are fighting over a girl. Gloria tries to interfere when she sees how Haley's boss treats her with no respect. Jay is upset that Gloria wants him to get Lily's princess castle for Joe, while Phil is upset because Claire does not allow him to buy a vintage Ms. Pac-Man game. Mitchell and Cameron feel like they want to adopt another kid but have second thoughts after babysitting Joe.

"Integrity" received mixed reviews from critics.

== Plot ==
Jay (Ed O'Neill) begins to worry that he does not have a conventionally masculine son, as Manny (Rico Rodriguez) mourns his girlfriend's loss and Gloria (Sofia Vergara) dresses and makes up Joe (Pierce Wallace) like a girl. Phil (Ty Burrell), who runs errands with him in order to get Lily's (Aubrey Anderson-Emmons) Princess Castle for Joe, is upset too as Claire (Julie Bowen) refuses to let him buy a new Pac-Man game. On the road, the two men bond over their respective difficulties and exchange advise with each other, until Phil misinterprets Jay's words and unties the castle from the car. The castle falls in the road and a truck hits it before the two of them get it back, resulting in its destruction.

Haley (Sarah Hyland) feels as if her boss, Gavin Sinclair (Michael Urie), disrespects her since he treats his own plant better than he treats her or his employees. Gloria suggests that Haley should stand up for herself more, but Haley explains that Gloria cannot understand the full situation, as Haley still lives in her parents’ house and does not have a rich husband to fall back on. At first, Gloria seems to understand, but then her choleric personality comes back and she forces Gavin to apologize to Haley.

Luke (Nolan Gould) feels bad because Manny's girlfriend hit on him, but Claire misinterprets his mood as him having trouble in accepting the fact that Alex (Ariel Winter) receives medals from their school while he gets nothing. Claire decides to visit Principal Brown (Andrew Daly) who, though he remembers Alex and Haley, has no recollection of Luke and does not seem to know who he is. When Claire fails to bribe him in giving an award to Luke, she pushes the car of the winner of the "Integrity Award" into a handicapped parking space. When the Principal finds the car there, he decides to finally give the award to Luke. Luke soon reveals that he did not want an award in the first place, and consequently lived the worst day of his life. Initially believing Manny to be the real culprit, Luke prepares to fight him, until Claire reveals the truth.

Mitchell (Jesse Tyler Ferguson) and Cameron (Eric Stonestreet) have the desire to adopt another child but because they think that the other one might not be ready, no one says anything and they try to make each other understand their wish by babysitting Joe and looking happy while doing it. Lily feels excluded but Mitch and Cameron notice that Joe can be quite a handful, especially when he begins to break and damage their possessions. They ultimately realize they are more than happy with their lives as they are, and decide not to adopt another baby.

The episode ends with the whole family (except Haley) trying to re-build Lily's princess castle and paint it into a Pirate's castle for Joe, while he and Lily play together. Alex receives more prizes and medals and provides a speech to the family about integrity.

== Reception ==
=== Ratings ===
In its original American broadcast, "Integrity" was watched by 8.00; down by 0.85 from the previous episode.

=== Reviews ===
"Integrity" received mixed reviews from critics.

Whitney Evans of TV Fanatic rated the episode with 4/5 saying there were a lot of moving parts in the episode and some stories worked better than the others but everything came together beautifully at the end. Evans praises the pairing of Phil and Jay stating: "You know you're in for a fun half hour whenever Jay and Phil are together. Of all the many Modern Family pairings over the years, the Jay and Phil dynamic has always been one of the stronger ones. I could watch Phil attempt to give Jay a high five over and over again and it would never get old."

Lisa Fernandes of Next Projection rated the episode with 7.5/10 commenting on the plot around Joe, with Jay's reaction to Gloria painting Joe's toenails red and wanting him to get Lily's Princess Castle for him: "This episode isn’t the worst thing the show’s ever produced but it also serves as an example of how far behind American society it’s fallen. In a world where transgender rights is being celebrated and the struggle for acceptance is reaching a new fever pitch, we should be beyond plots like these." By concluding her review she says: "Embarrassing gender politics combine with decent humor. Kudos to Ariel Winter for providing the episode’s biggest laugh with Alex’s multiple acceptance speeches over the credits."

David Kallison of The A.V. Club awarded the episode with a C+, also criticizing the way Joe's plotline was presented. "It’s honestly a bit strange how Modern Family handles this storyline. [...] I’m not saying the show is required to dive into a thesis on gender dysmorphia, but you’ve never seen fear on a dad’s face like when his boy grabs a pink bike. “Integrity” seemed to be set up to make fun of Jay’s fears, but instead skirts and somewhat excuses them. None of it feels narratively cohesive. I was disappointed in a missed opportunity to comment on a very real and relatable issue."
