= Knock 'Em Down =

- Modern Family episode
- Episode no.: Season 6 Episode 20
- Directed by: Beth McCarthy Miller
- Written by: Rick Wiener; Kenny Schwartz
- Production code: 6ARG20
- Original air date: April 22, 2015

Guest appearances
- Steve Zahn as Ronnie; Oliver Platt as Martin; Andrea Anders as Amber

Episode chronology
← Previous "Grill, Interrupted"	Next → "Integrity"
- Modern Family season 6

"Knock 'Em Down" is the twentieth episode of the sixth season of the American sitcom Modern Family, and the series' 140th episode overall. It originally aired on April 22, 2015. The episode was written by Rick Wiener & Kenny Schwartz, and directed by Beth McCarthy Miller.

In the episode, Jay joins Cameron's bowling team to replace an injured player, not knowing that he will have to be (act) gay to play in this league. Mitchell and Gloria want to prove that they are not old, so they accept Haley's offer to go clubbing all night. Phil and Claire finally come closer to their new neighbors, Ronnie and Amber, over a sculpture that they all dislike, helping them discover other things they have in common.

"Knock 'Em Down" received positive reviews from the critics.

== Plot ==
Phil (Ty Burrell) tries to sell a house but the buyers take back their offer when they see a pornographic sculpture decorating a neighbor's home. Phil finds out that surprisingly Ronnie (Steve Zahn) and Amber (Andrea Anders) hate the statue too and when they ask him and Claire (Julie Bowen) to join them at a restaurant for dinner they accept the offer. During the dinner, Claire and Phil discover that they share a lot of common things with the LaFontaine couple and on their way home, Ronnie, Claire and Amber decide to destroy the sculpture. Phil, who is the only one who objects, actually becomes responsible for destroying it after accidentally crashing into it with Ronnie's car. As a cop walks by wanting to check about the sculpture, Phil recognizes him as one of his clients and lets him believe that the four of them were just eating and had nothing to do with the accident.

Jay (Ed O'Neill) accepts to join Cameron's (Eric Stonestreet) bowling team for the night to replace an injured friend. However, since you have to be gay to be on the team and be able to participate, Cameron told everyone that Jay is gay except from Jay himself, at least not until they get there. As Cameron's rival Martin (Oliver Platt) tells Cameron that Jay is straight, Cameron lets him believe that Jay is only acting weird because he is attracted to him. Cameron's team wins the game with Jay's help but when Martin nervously approaches Jay and asks him out, Jay's conscience lets him do the right thing and he softly admits to Martin that he is actually heterosexual. This ultimately disqualifies Cameron's team, allowing Martin's team to win and get the trophy.

In the meantime, Haley (Sarah Hyland) invites Mitchell (Jesse Tyler Ferguson) and Gloria (Sofia Vergara) to go clubbing with her one night and the two of them accept wanting to prove Jay and Cameron that they can still have fun and stay up all night. Whilst the night begins well, as the time passes, both Mitchell and Gloria fall asleep, realizing that they are no longer as young as they were and Cameron was right that they were unable to stay up to go clubbing. Haley wakes them up and they convince themselves to try again and they join Haley, only to give up and change their opinion mere moments later, admitting that they are too old for clubbing.

At the end of the episode, Alex (Ariel Winter) sees her parents talking with the LaFontaines and tells Luke (Nolan Gould) that art is the best way to connect people. When she learns that he was actually trying to draw the sculpture, she advises him not to speak to her again, and Luke labels her a hypocrite.

== Reception ==
=== Ratings ===
In its original American broadcast, "Knock 'Em Down" was watched by 8.85; down by 0.58 from the previous episode.

=== Reviews ===
"Knock 'Em Down" received positive reviews from the critics.

Gwen Ihnat of The A.V. Club awarded the episode a B grade, saying "Modern Family so often starts with the standard sitcom trope, but the show really excels when it rises above the norm and takes a different turn. This happens in two out of three of the shuffled-character plots in this episode". Despite being critical of the Haley-Gloria-Mitchell subplot, Ihnat did however praise Sarah Hyland's performance, stating "Sarah Hyland, as usual, does her game best, offering them the cocktails of their relative peoples, mojitos and cosmos, and suggesting that they go dancing in the daytime instead."

Ashley Bissette Sumerel of TV Fanatic also praised the episode, rating it with 4.2/5. Sumerel heavily praised the Cameron and Jay plot, saying "These are my favorite kinds of stories for Jay. I love seeing him break out of his comfort zone, especially as he becomes more and more open-minded". Sumerel also praised the Haley-Gloria-Mitchell subplot and Haley's characterization, saying "It says something about the close relationship she has with all of them that they can share these experiences, and it may also be another way we can define this family as a "modern" one".

Lisa Fernandes of Next Projection also enjoyed the episode, rating it with 8.1/10. Fernandes praised the Jay and Cameron storyline, saying "Most of the best chunks of the storyline come from Oliver Platt’s appearance as Cam’s latest rival, where he manages to wring a deadpan acerbicness from his rotely written character". Fernandes also praised Julie Bowen's performance, by saying "Julie Bowen’s funny, elastic performance is the best one here, though Steve Zahn continues to apply a cool sense of reserve to his every appearance as the LaFontaine paterfamilias".
