= The Big Guns =

- Modern Family episode
- Episode no.: Season 6 Episode 12
- Directed by: Jeffrey Walker
- Written by: Vali Chandrasekaran
- Production code: 6ARG14
- Original air date: January 14, 2015

Guest appearances
- Fred Willard as Frank Dunphy; Steve Zahn as Ronnie; Andrea Anders as Amber; Jack Axelrod as Harvey; Edmund L. Shaff as Victor; Elimu Nelson as Officer Clemons

Episode chronology
← Previous "The Day We Almost Died"	Next → "Rash Decisions"
- Modern Family season 6

"The Big Guns" is the twelfth episode of the sixth season of the American sitcom Modern Family, and the series' 132nd episode overall. It originally aired on January 14, 2015. The episode was written by Vali Chandrasekaran and directed by Jeffrey Walker .

== Plot ==
Ronnie (Steve Zahn) and Amber (Andrea Anders) get a boat and they park it on their front lawn, something that makes Claire (Julie Bowen) and Phil (Ty Burrell) furious. Phil tries to tell them politely to remove the boat but when he sees that being polite leads nowhere, he decides to call his father Frank (Fred Willard) and all his retiree friends to come and camp in front of their houses with their trailers. At first everything seems to go well for Phil and Claire but Ronnie gets along with the older men and they all hang out together. That leads Claire to call the police.

In the meantime, Luke (Nolan Gould) tries to flirt with Tammy (Brooke Sorenson) who lies on the boat in her swimsuit. Tammy turns him down every time he talks to her. At the end, Luke passes next to Tammy without even looking at her and pretending that he no longer cares about her, something that makes her mad. It turns out that Alex (Ariel Winter) advised him to act like that to make Tammy notice him.

Jay (Ed O'Neill) tries to potty train Joe (Pierce Wallace) despite Gloria's (Sofía Vergara) warnings that Joe has to be ready on his own and Jay has to not put stress on him. The real reason Jay wants to train Joe is because every time he goes to the store to buy diapers, people think that he asks diapers for himself. After a long time and the moment Jay is ready to give up, Joe manages to use the potty.

Cameron (Eric Stonestreet) takes Lily (Aubrey Anderson-Emmons) to a clown school without telling Mitch (Jesse Tyler Ferguson) because he knows that Mitch will disapprove of it. When Mitch discovers the situation, he becomes angry, but Cameron urges him to give Lily a chance to show that "she's a natural." Despite an underwhelming initial performance, Lily switches tactics and starts humorously hitting Cameron, which finally makes Mitchell laugh, albeit at Cameron's expense. Concerned, Cameron asks Mitch not to encourage Lily and to talk to her instead. Lily confesses to Mitch that she actually dislikes being a clown and is acting this way to prompt Cameron to ask her to quit without hurting his feelings. Mitch advises her to be honest with Cameron, but Lily struggles with the idea of disappointing him, expressing her doubts about living up to Cameron's clowning legacy.

== Reception ==
=== Ratings ===
In its original American broadcast, "The Big Guns" was watched by 9.44; up by 0.15 from the previous episode.

=== Reviews ===
"The Big Guns" received mixed reviews.

Lisa Fernandes from Next Projection rated the episode with 8.4/10 stating that despite the uncomfortable and marginally funny main plot, the secondary plots save the whole episode.

Leigh Raines of TV Fanatic rated the episode with 4/5. "It's not always easy to put up with your neighbors, especially when it's pot dealers with a huge boat."

Joshua Alston from The A.V. Club gave the episode a B− rating stating that it is nearly impossible not to make Dunphy-centric episodes due to the large number of family members and that might lead to some problematic episodes sometimes. ""The Big Guns" never kicks into full gear because so much of its time is spent setting up a standoff between the families that peters out without ever reaching anything resembling a climax. Because the episode is structured so oddly, it seems to end abruptly because it never totally feels like it has started. The entire episode feels like a well-constructed first act, at least for the Dunphys and Pritchett-Delgados, and then it goes off."
