= Do Not Push =

- Modern Family episode
- Episode no.: Season 6 Episode 2
- Directed by: Gail Mancuso
- Written by: Megan Ganz
- Production code: 6ATM02
- Original air date: October 1, 2014

Episode chronology
← Previous "The Long Honeymoon"	Next → "The Cold"
- Modern Family season 6

"Do Not Push" is the second episode of the sixth season of the American sitcom Modern Family, and the series' 122nd episode overall. It originally aired on October 1, 2014. The episode was written by Megan Ganz and directed by Gail Mancuso.

== Plot ==
Mitchell (Jesse Tyler Ferguson) and Cameron (Eric Stonestreet) want to take a new family portrait, since the previous photo did not include Lily (Aubrey Anderson-Emmons). While taking shots of the picture, they notice that Lily's smile is rather forced than natural, making her look unflattering. This causes a dilemma on whether they should tell Lily that she does not look good or keep it the way it is. Cam decides that it is for the best if they talk to her about it, but Lily gets upset believing she is ugly. At the end, both Cam and Mitch apologize and they use the first photo with Lily's "big smile" to print, making Lily happy, but they quickly dislike the way she laughs.

Meanwhile, the Dunphys are visiting Caltech on a tour of the campus. Claire (Julie Bowen) keeps pushing Alex (Ariel Winter) to go there instead of MIT, since it is less than hour away from their home, making it easier for the family to see her. Alex, however, wants to get as far away from her family as she could. That is until she meets a cute, friendly, smart boy named Jason (Caleb Hoffman) who tells her her choice of college should depend on more than how far it takes her away from her family. At the end of the day, Claire apologizes to Alex for trying to force her to choose Caltech, but Alex tells her she's now considering attending (but doesn't point out it's for Jason and not to be close to home).

In the meantime, Phil (Ty Burrell), Luke (Nolan Gould) and Haley (Sarah Hyland) sign up to be part of an experiment being conducted at the university. They are left in a waiting room where they notice a red button with a label that says "Do Not Push". Phil says that the experiment has already begun thinking that scientists are surveying them from the other side of a one-way mirror to see if they will push the button or not. Luke wants to push the button, Phil doesn't while Haley couldn't care. The three end up in an argument and it eventually comes out that Phil is worried that he's raised Luke to be too irresponsible while Haley has an emotional outburst where she confesses she hates being thought of as a stupid washout. The three of them work out their issues and decide to push the button together. When pressed, it turns on the faulty air conditioner which the test supervisor complains they'll have to call someone in to switch it off. He gives them their written tests as Haley discovers the mirror is just a mirror.

Jay (Ed O'Neill) and Gloria (Sofia Vergara) have their anniversary and this year, and Jay decides to give her a clay bunny that he made in a ceramics class instead of an expensive bracelet. When he gives the bunny to Gloria, she breaks the bunny thinking that there is something inside. Jay is embarrassed to tell her the truth and pretends that the jeweler forgot to put the bracelet inside the bunny, then goes to the store to buy her one. Manny (Rico Rodriguez) explains to Gloria what the gift was about and that there was not any bracelet. Feeling bad for what she did, Gloria decides to glue the bunny back together and to give Jay a home made present herself. They initially plan to return the bracelet and a luxury watch that Gloria purchased for Jay, but realize that they enjoy expensive presents for each other too and keep both gifts.

== Reception ==
=== Ratings ===
In its original run, "Do Not Push" was viewed by a total audience of 10.56 million people, a 0.82 decrease from the previous episode.

=== Reviews ===
The episode received mixed reviews.

Joshuan Alston from The A.V. Club gave the episode a C. "The biggest offender in “Do Not Push” is the Pritchett-Delgado plot, which could be lifted out and dropped into any episode in the history of this show. If not for the appearance of Manny and Joe, there would be nothing to help distinguish it from any other story the show has ever told about Jay and Gloria buying each other gifts, and getting the wrong thing, or too much of the right thing or whatever other slight variation the writers have done".

Leigh Raines from TV Fanatic gave the episode a rate of 3.5/5, saying "Everyone knows that Alex is the golden goose of the family when it comes to going far with her education. She is a brilliant girl and will definitely have her choice of colleges. Claire is obviously excited, since she's really the only one in the Dunphy clan who relates to Alex at all. However, it seems the middle child is feeling a bit stifled".

Lisa Fernandes from Next Projection gave a good review to the episode stating: "After last week’s weak return, "Do Not Push" is a sentimental, funny but rushed example of the show at its strongest."
