= A Hard Jay's Night =

- Modern Family episode
- Episode no.: Season 5 Episode 19
- Directed by: Beth McCarthy-Miller
- Written by: Megan Ganz; Ben Karlin
- Production code: 5ARG20
- Original air date: April 2, 2014

Episode chronology
← Previous "Las Vegas"	Next → "Australia"
- Modern Family season 5

"A Hard Jay's Night" is the 19th episode of the fifth season of the American sitcom Modern Family, and the series' 115th overall. It was aired on April 2, 2014. The episode was written by Megan Ganz and Ben Karlin and directed by Beth McCarthy-Miller. The episode touches heavily on the theme of discomfort in settling into new phases of life. The title of the episode, is a reference to the Lennon-McCartney, written Beatles track, and film A Hard Day's Night (film)

== Plot ==
Jay (Ed O'Neill) was sick the whole week and Claire (Julie Bowen) had to replace him at work, something that she performed exceptionally and cannot stop talking about to Haley (Sarah Hyland), Alex (Ariel Winter), and Luke (Nolan Gould) on their way to Jay's for the "Jay's Night" he has organized. When they get there, Claire expects to hear at least one "thank you" from her father for her good job at the office but he never says it. Claire says that she has learned all these years not to expect anything more from her father and pretends that she does not care but things between her and Jay get more intense when Jay decides to make his own sauce for the pasta despite the fact that Claire has already made some.

Luke tells Manny (Rico Rodriguez) that there is a party happening nearby to which he is not invited but wants to go to. Manny tells him that they must stay for Jay's Night instead going to a party they are not invited to. Manny catches Luke trying to leave and tries to change his mind but Luke does not hear and goes to the party. Manny follows him and when they reach the door, the party host recognizes Manny and reveals that Manny had been invited to the party making Luke feel rejected and dejected, he reveals that he felt that Manny had always been the awkward one and he the cool one, but now Manny's style was more liked.

Cam's (Eric Stonestreet) dad sends him and Mitch (Jesse Tyler Ferguson) a cake topper for their wedding cake that he made himself. The topper is made of soap and it is a miniature of Cam and Mitch. Cam is excited with the gift while Mitch hates it but he can not say anything because both of them have already used their three vetoes they had for the wedding, so he tries everything he can to destroy it.

Phil (Ty Burrell) helps Gloria (Sofía Vergara) sell her apartment that she lived in with Manny before she married Jay. While they are waiting for their appointment, they go to the neighbour's salon where Gloria used to work. The women who work there are excited to see her and when they ask for her help since one of the girls did not come for work, Gloria agrees to help them out while Phil, who demonstrates experience, does the shampooing.

Cam and Mitch arrive at Jay's house and Cam shows everyone the new cake topper. Jay and Mitch conspire about it and Jay says that he has a friend that helps him make things disappear. Cam notices after a while that the topper is gone and Jay blames Stella the dog saying that she buries things in the garden. Cam has to find the topper and he forces Mitch to dig up the whole garden with him till they find it. When they do, Cam reveals his plan to make many miniatures and give them to all their friends at the wedding, something that finally makes Mitch admit how much he hates the topper. They agree to use one more veto each so Mitch gets rid of the topper and Cam says he wants the wedding singer gone. It is later revealed that Cam was the one who sent the picture to his dad to make the topper, knowing that it would make Mitch mad and he could have one more veto to get rid of the singer.

In the meantime, Gloria avoids Phil's reminders that they will miss the appointment with the potential buyer, something that makes Phil understand that Gloria does not really want to sell her old apartment. He manages to make her talk to him and he tells her that when she feels ready to sell, he will be there to help her. They leave the salon and go back home.

The whole family is gathered together for Jay's Night and when Cam and Mitch bring all the things that Stella "buried", Gloria realizes that Jay was using the dog to get rid of all the things he hated. Among them is also a gift he got from his employees that makes Claire realize that her father's behavior towards her was because he is not ready to leave the company and let her take over. She reassures him that this will only happen when he feels ready to retire and they make up.

== Reception ==
=== Ratings ===
In its original American broadcast, "A Hard Jay's Night" was watched by 9.00 million; down by 1.09 from the previous episode.

=== Reviews ===
"A Hard Jay's Night" received positive reviews with some of the reviewers comparing it with the previous week's episode.

Joshua Alston from The A.V. Club gave a B− rating to the episode saying that after last week's episode he was expecting a step down for this week's. "It isn’t a terrible episode of the show, but it does return to season five’s meh-just-okay baseline. [...] What I will give "A Hard Jay’s Night" credit for is its character development, which has generally been spot on this season, even when the plot that gives rise to the forward movement doesn't completely work."

Leigh Raines of TV Fanatic rated the episode with 4/5.

Jordan Adler from We Got This Covered gives a good review comparing it with "Las Vegas" episode. "After last week’s manic, high-energy episode that was "Las Vegas" [...] "A Hard Jay’s Night" is a rather restrained, merely decent, sort of harmless half hour. If last week's Modern Family was an all-you-can-eat buffet of comedy, this episode is comfort food. The viewer gets exactly what he or she expects and little more."
