= Modern Family season 6 =

Modern Family
- Season 6
- DVD cover
- Starring: Ed O'Neill; Sofía Vergara; Julie Bowen; Ty Burrell; Jesse Tyler Ferguson; Eric Stonestreet; Sarah Hyland; Ariel Winter; Nolan Gould; Rico Rodriguez; Aubrey Anderson-Emmons
- No. of episodes: 24

Release
- Original network: ABC
- Original release: September 24, 2014 – May 20, 2015

Season chronology
- ← Previous; Season 5 Next → Season 7

The sixth season of the American television sitcom Modern Family aired on ABC from September 24, 2014, to May 20, 2015.

This season was ordered on May 18, 2014. The season was produced by Steven Levitan Productions and Picador Productions in association with 20th Century Fox Television, with creators Steven Levitan and Christopher Lloyd as showrunners.

== Cast ==
=== Main cast ===
- Ed O'Neill as Jay Pritchett
- Sofía Vergara as Gloria Pritchett
- Julie Bowen as Claire Dunphy
- Ty Burrell as Phil Dunphy
- Jesse Tyler Ferguson as Mitchell Pritchett
- Eric Stonestreet as Cameron Tucker
- Sarah Hyland as Haley Dunphy
- Ariel Winter as Alex Dunphy
- Nolan Gould as Luke Dunphy
- Rico Rodriguez as Manny Delgado
- Aubrey Anderson-Emmons as Lily Tucker-Pritchett

=== Recurring cast ===
- Steve Zahn as Ronnie LaFontaine
- Andrea Anders as Amber LaFontaine
- Adam DeVine as Andy Bailey

=== Guest cast ===
- Rory Scovel as Carl
- Tyne Daly as Mrs. Plank
- Jon Polito as Earl Chambers
- Finneas O'Connell as Ronnie Jr. LaFontaine
- Brooke Sorenson as Tammy LaFontaine
- Ben Lawson as George
- Fiona Gubelmann as Lisa
- Michael Urie as Gavin Sinclair
- Nicholas Gonzalez as Diego
- Nigella Lawson as herself
- Rob Riggle as Gil Thorpe
- Fred Willard as Frank Dunphy
- Stephanie Beatriz as Sonia Ramirez
- Nathan Lane as Pepper Saltzman
- Elizabeth Banks as Sal
- Christian Barillas as Ronaldo
- Penn Jillette as Edward LeGrand
- Natasha Leggero as Dana
- Kevin Daniels as Longines
- Reid Ewing as Dylan Marshall
- Joe Mande as Ben
- Laura Ashley Samuels as Beth
- Robbie Amell as Chase
- Will Sasso as Señor Kaplan
- Alyson Reed as Angela
- Pierce Wallace as Joe Pritchett
- Andrew Daly as Principal Brown
- Benjamin Bratt as Javier Delgado

== Episodes ==
No. overall	No. in season	Title	Directed by	Written by	Original release date	Prod. code	U.S. viewers (millions)
121	1	"The Long Honeymoon"	Beth McCarthy-Miller	Danny Zuker	September 24, 2014	6ARG01	11.38
Cameron goes to great lengths to preserve the romance and is not ready to conclude his honeymoon with Mitchell. Gloria asks Jay to make over his appearance. The Dunphys must ready themselves for the end of their perfect summer, but when Alex comes back from a humanitarian trip, chaos immediately returns to the household.
122	2	"Do Not Push"	Gail Mancuso	Megan Ganz	October 1, 2014	6ARG02	10.56
Gloria and Jay decide between a sentimental and an expensive gift for their anniversary. The Dunphys visit Caltech and Alex has a realization about college. Mitch and Cam want to make a new family portrait.
123	3	"The Cold"	Jim Hensz	Rick Wiener & Kenny Schwartz	October 8, 2014	6ARG03	10.30
Phil has to change his plans when a cold plagues his brothers-in-law's wedding video. Meanwhile, Jay, Gloria, and Cam disagree about Manny's place in the high school football team. Mitchell makes a new enemy in Lily's friend Sydney, who happens to be a genius.
124	4	"Marco Polo"	Fred Savage	Elaine Ko	October 15, 2014	6ARG05	9.71
The Dunphys have to temporarily leave their house and live in a hotel. Meanwhile, Manny dates a girl who is much older and more popular than he is. Cameron has trouble with Mitchell's presence, which is preventing Cameron from maintaining his team's winning streak.
125	5	"Won't You Be Our Neighbor"	Gail Mancuso	Paul Corrigan & Brad Walsh	October 22, 2014	6ARG04	10.16
Phil and Claire are less than enthusiastic while meeting their new obnoxious neighbors. Jay learns that Manny's new girlfriend is also his former business partner's granddaughter. Mitchell and Cameron discover something about Lily's unsympathetic teacher.
126	6	"Halloween 3: AwesomeLand"	Gail Mancuso	Paul Corrigan & Brad Walsh & Abraham Higginbotham	October 29, 2014	6ARG06	9.92
The third Halloween special of the series. Phil takes over Claire's annual Halloween in order to make a fest of his own. Jay, who refuses to wear a Shrek costume that Gloria bought for him, prefers to be Prince Charming instead. Cameron is overwhelmed by the day's activities and Mitchell has closing arguments for a case.
127	7	"Queer Eyes, Full Hearts"	Jason Winer	Stephen Lloyd	November 12, 2014	6ARG08	9.83
Phil and Claire are unaware of whether they should be happy or concerned that Haley and Andy are spending a lot of time together — though they soon find out that things are just not as they appear. Gloria is pushing Manny to learn Spanish instead of French and hires a Spanish tutor, Diego, who — much to Manny and Jay's chagrin — also happens to be very handsome. Meanwhile, Mitch and Cam meet a popular news reporter at a school function and one of them piques her journalistic interest.
128	8	"Three Turkeys"	Beth McCarthy-Miller	Jeffrey Richman	November 19, 2014	6ARG09	10.88
Phil is cooking Thanksgiving dinner this year with Luke as his "sous-chef". Claire has no confidence in them and prepares a secret turkey of her own as backup. Jay and Gloria had plans to spend the holiday away, but when the trip gets canceled at the last minute they decide not to tell anyone. Mitch is tired of always being the bad cop and forces Cameron to deal with Lily's refusal to wear a nice dress to dinner.
129	9	"Strangers in the Night"	Fred Savage	Chuck Tatham	December 3, 2014	6ARG07	9.02
When Alex tells Phil and Claire she has a boyfriend, they worry the pressure they have put on her caused her to make up an imaginary boyfriend. Jay and Gloria both have parties that they are dragging one another to, but Jay has a clever plan to get himself out of it. It's too bad Manny just might spoil everything. Mitch and Cam get a beautiful white couch, but it is threatened by Brenda, a co-worker who is staying with them.
130	10	"Haley's 21st Birthday"	Alisa Statman	Abraham Higginbotham	December 10, 2014	6ARG10	9.69
For her 21st birthday, Haley goes to a bar with the adults. Claire tries too hard to be Haley's friend and forgets to be Haley's mother. Mitch and Cam realize that they are not as cool as they thought. Also, Jay and Phil struggle with Haley's gift, a new car. Alex, Luke, and Manny babysit Lily, who asks where babies come from.
131	11	"The Day We Almost Died"	James Bagdonas	Danny Zuker	January 7, 2015	6ARG13	9.29
While driving out to get breakfast, the Dunphys and Manny have a near-death experience, causing everyone to reevaluate their lives. Claire resolves to be more fun and less uptight, Haley and Alex agree not to fight anymore, Manny refuses to ever ride in a car again, Luke wants to check off his bucket list, Phil decides to be a take action type of guy, and the rest of the family has to bear the brunt of all the new attitudes.
132	12	"The Big Guns"	Jeffrey Walker	Vali Chandrasekaran	January 14, 2015	6ARG14	9.44
Claire is furious about neighbors Ronnie and Amber's eyesore of a boat on their front lawn and it soon becomes an all-out war when Phil calls in the "big guns" as back up -- his dad Frank and all his retired friends to give them a taste of their own medicine. Elsewhere, Jay is trying to potty train Joe but Gloria does not think he is ready yet, and Cam secretly takes Lily to clown school behind Mitchell's back.
133	13	"Rash Decisions"	Jim Hensz	Teleplay by : Daisy Gardner; Story by : Anthony Lombardo & Clint McCray	February 4, 2015	6ARG16	9.87
Luke begins to distance from Phil, who makes Andy his new right hand man. Gloria discovers that Joe may be allergic to Stella. Mitchell starts doing freelance legal work at Jay's company. Alex has a college interview with Princeton.
134	14	"Valentine's Day 4: Twisted Sister"	Fred Savage	Jeffrey Richman	February 11, 2015	6ARG15	9.77
The fourth Valentine's Day special of the series. Phil and Claire reprise their roles of Juliana and Clive Bixby, but Phil may be more into Juliana than his wife. Sonia (Stephanie Beatriz), Gloria's sister, is in town, putting Jay in an awkward situation. Mitchell and Cameron visit their friend Anders.
135	15	"Fight or Flight"	Steven Levitan	Abraham Higginbotham	February 18, 2015	6ARG18	8.80
Phil and Claire return from a long reunion weekend with Phil's buddies, but Claire takes the only First Class seat on their flight home. Jay teaches Manny how to defend himself against a bully who attends cooking classes with him. Mitchell, Cameron, Pepper, and their friends organize a baby shower for Sal.
136	16	"Connection Lost"	Steven Levitan	Steven Levitan & Megan Ganz	February 25, 2015	6ARG12	9.32
Claire's computer becomes the hub of all the family's activities when she gets stuck at the airport and is desperate to reach Haley after a big fight. After FaceTiming with Phil and the rest of the family to help track her down, Claire quickly turns to online snooping that inevitably becomes disturbing real quick and everyone gets sucked into the online drama.
137	17	"Closet? You'll Love It!"	Ryan Case	Elaine Ko	March 4, 2015	6ARG11	9.61
Claire and Jay have to participate at a closet advertising. Meanwhile, Phil, Luke, and Manny help Gloria to protect her privacy. Cam panics when he discovers that Lilly has a recital but sings off tune and Andy gets appendicitis.
138	18	"Spring Break"	Gail Mancuso	Paul Corrigan & Brad Walsh	March 25, 2015	6ARG17	8.71
Luke begins to outperform Phil at seemingly everything, Claire cleans everywhere and Haley takes Alex to a music festival. Jay and Gloria have to give up one vice, but Cam and Mitch's presence may interfere with their plans.
139	19	"Grill, Interrupted"	James Bagdonas	Paul Corrigan & Brad Walsh & Jeffrey Richman	April 1, 2015	6ARG21	9.43
Jay's birthday is approaching and Phil offers him a high-tech outdoor grill . Mitch and Claire have a great present idea for their father while Gloria gives Luke and Manny a lesson about alcohol. Haley has a new boyfriend, much to Andy's annoyance.
140	20	"Knock 'Em Down"	Beth McCarthy-Miller	Rick Wiener & Kenny Schwartz	April 22, 2015	6ARG20	8.85
Jay agrees to sub in on Cam's bowling team for the finals but Cam wasn't fully upfront about it being an all gay league, that puts Jay in a precarious position. Phil and Claire have a surprisingly good time with unlikely dinner companions, their neighbors Ronnie and Amber, and Gloria and Mitch agree to go clubbing with Haley to prove they're still young and fun but they didn't anticipate the pre-party portion of the night.
141	21	"Integrity"	Chris Koch	Stephen Lloyd & Chuck Tatham	April 29, 2015	6ARG19	8.00
Jay and Phil retrieve Lily's old Princess Castle for Joe, although both are currently angry at their wives, while Mitchell and Cameron have their hands full babysitting Joe himself. Meanwhile, Gloria helps Haley stand up for herself at work while Claire attempts to bribe Luke's Principal into giving him an award.
142	22	"Patriot Games"	Alisa Statman	Vali Chandrasekaran	May 6, 2015	6ARG22	8.57
Phil and Claire have to compete against Sanjay's parents in order to help Alex to be valedictorian. Elsewhere, Javier tries to prevent Gloria from becoming an American Citizen and Mitch and Cam join a protest against a local restaurant.
143	23	"Crying Out Loud"	Ryan Case	Megan Ganz & Stephen Lloyd & Chuck Tatham	May 13, 2015	6ARG23	8.13
As Claire is approached in order to work in a hotel, she worries about Jay's feelings to see her departure from his company. Manny has wisdom teeth removed, letting Gloria ruin his sentimental life. Phil, Haley and Luke try to convince Alex to try senior skip day. Mitch and Cam worry about why Lily acts apathetic.
144	24	"American Skyper"	Steven Levitan	Elaine Ko	May 20, 2015	6ARG24	7.20
Phil is stuck in Seattle because of an ear infection while on a business trip but finds a creative way to keep in touch with his family as Alex graduates. Gloria's cousin gets on Jay's nerves. Andy has to choose between Haley and Beth. Haley thinks that Beth is out to get her because of her feelings for Andy. Claire wants to find a better gift for her daughter after Jay gives her a trip to Europe. Mitchell does not know how to tell Cameron, who suspects that Mitchell is cheating on him, that he has been fired again. Phil discovers that Andy and Haley love each other.

== Reception ==
=== Reviews ===
Modern Family's sixth season received positive reviews from television critics, with some claiming it an improvement over the previous couple of seasons that had a mixed critical reception, and a return to form for the show.

Various writers from The A.V. Club have awarded the majority of episodes a "B" grade or higher - with particular praise for "The Day We Almost Died", "Closet? You'll Love It!" and "Crying Out Loud"- marking an improvement over the repeated "C" grade given throughout the previous season. "Connection Lost" also received high acclaim, with many praising its originality and ability to transcend what could have been a "gimmicky episode". Discussing "Three Turkeys", Fourthmic stated that the episode was "another strong one in season that has seen the series return to the quality that we came to appreciate in the first couple of seasons". In her review for "Closet? You'll Love It!" Gwen Ihnat of The A.V. Club stated that the episode represents "all the reasons why we still watch Modern Family" and awarded the episode an A−. On the same site, David Kallison reviewed "Grill, Interrupted" and said "This season proves that sitcoms can survive on solid characters and solid jokes".

Sarah Hyland's performance as Haley Dunphy has received consistently positive reviews over the course of the sixth season. In his review for Queer Eyes, Full Hearts Evan Slead labelled her "truly a great comedic actress. She has a way of making the ditzy and superficial type earn some respect and notoriety". Reviewing Rash Decisions, Gwen Ihnat of The A.V. Club labelled Hyland the 'performer of the week', saying "It’s hard to picture a time when this wouldn’t be Sarah Hyland, but Haley continues to be just a whirlwind of delight".

== Ratings ==
Viewership and ratings per episode of Modern Family season 6
No.	Title	Air date	Rating/share (18–49)	Viewers (millions)	DVR (18–49)	DVR viewers (millions)	Total (18–49)	Total viewers (millions)
1	"The Long Honeymoon"	September 24, 2014	3.9/12 (11)	11.38 (16)	2.2	4.80	6.0	15.87
2	"Do Not Push"	October 1, 2014	3.7/12 (7)	10.56 (21)	2.1	4.62	5.7	14.79
3	"The Cold"	October 8, 2014	3.5/11 (7)	10.30 (17)	2.3	4.89	5.8	15.18
4	"Marco Polo"	October 15, 2014	3.4/10 (10)	9.71 (23)	1.9	4.33	5.3	14.04
5	"Won't You Be Your Neighbor"	October 22, 2014	3.4/10 (7)	10.16 (19)	2.2	4.93	5.6	15.09
6	"Halloween 3: AwesomeLand"	October 29, 2014	3.5/10 (7)	9.92 (19)	2.4	5.20	5.9	15.12
7	"Queer Eyes, Full Hearts"	November 12, 2014	3.2/9 (8)	9.83 (20)	2.2	4.93	5.4	14.76
8	"Three Turkeys"	November 19, 2014	3.7/11 (5)	10.88 (12)	2.3	4.92	6.0	15.80
9	"Strangers in the Night"	December 3, 2014	2.8/8 (7)	9.02 (14)	2.2	4.79	5.0	13.81
10	"Haley's 21st Birthday"	December 10, 2014	3.1/10 (6)	9.69 (14)	2.3	4.80	5.4	14.49
11	"The Day We Almost Died"	January 7, 2015	3.2/9 (7)	9.29 (20)	2.2	4.79	5.4	14.08
12	"The Big Guns"	January 14, 2015	3.0/9 (5)	9.44 (15)	2.1	4.50	5.1	13.94
13	"Rash Decisions"	February 4, 2015	3.4/10 (4)	9.87 (13)	2.0	4.70	5.4	14.58
14	"Valentine's Day 4: Twisted Sister"	February 11, 2015	3.3/10 (3)	9.77 (15)	2.2	4.79	5.5	14.56
15	"Fight or Flight"	February 18, 2015	3.1/9 (9)	8.80 (21)	2.1	4.81	5.2	13.61
16	"Connection Lost"	February 25, 2015	3.4/10 (5)	9.32 (17)	2.1	5.00	5.5	14.31
17	"Closet? You'll Love It!"	March 4, 2015	3.4/10 (5)	9.61 (16)	2.2	4.93	5.6	14.53
18	"Spring Break"	March 25, 2015	2.9/9 (2)	8.71 (14)	2.3	4.97	5.1	13.51
19	"Grill, Interrupted"	April 1, 2015	3.0/10 (3)	9.43 (8)	2.1	4.83	5.1	14.26
20	"Knock 'Em Down"	April 22, 2015	3.0/10 (3)	8.85 (17)	1.9	4.39	4.9	13.24
21	"Integrity"	April 29, 2015	2.9/10 (2)	8.00 (22)	1.8	4.04	4.7	12.04
22	"Patriot Games"	May 6, 2015	2.9/9 (2)	8.57 (13)	1.8	4.02	4.7	12.54
23	"Crying Out Loud"	May 13, 2015	2.7/9 (2)	8.13 (16)	1.9	4.24	4.6	12.39
24	"American Skyper"	May 20, 2015	2.3/8 (6)	7.20 (15)	2.1	4.93	4.4	12.13

== DVD release ==
Modern Family: The Complete Sixth Season
Set Details		Special Features
24 episodes; 3-disc set; 1.78:1 aspect ratio; English (Dolby Digital 5.1); Subtitles: English, Spanish and French; Runtime: 517 minutes		Awesome Halloween; A Modern Thanksgiving; Modern Connections - The Making of the episode "Connection Lost"; A Day with Julie; Deleted Scenes; Gag Reel
Release Dates
Region 1	Region 2	Region 4
September 22, 2015	September 14, 2015	September 16, 2015
