= The Long Honeymoon =

- Modern Family episode
- Episode no.: Season 6 Episode 1
- Directed by: Beth McCarthy-Miller
- Written by: Danny Zuker
- Production code: 6ATM01
- Original air date: September 24, 2014

Episode chronology
← Previous "The Wedding"	Next → "Do Not Push"
- Modern Family season 6

"The Long Honeymoon" is the first episode, making it the season premiere, of the sixth season of the American sitcom Modern Family, and the series' 121st episode overall. The episode aired on September 24, 2014. The episode was written by Danny Zuker and directed by Beth McCarthy-Miller.

The episode follows three plots. After Cam and Mitch return from their honeymoon, Cam continues to be over romantic with Mitch, leading to Mitch confronting him. Meanwhile, Claire, Phil, Haley, and Luke enjoy a perfect summer, until Alex returns. When they realize this, they try to send Alex back. Gloria notices that Jay does not put a lot of effort into the way he looks. She gets upset by this and she argues with him in an attempt to get him to improve how he looks.

The episode received positive reviews from the critics.

== Plot ==
Cam (Eric Stonestreet) and Mitch (Jesse Tyler Ferguson) have been married for three months, however Cam is desperate to extend their honeymoon period, being over-romantic to Mitch such as buying him flowers every day and surprising him at work. This begins to annoy Mitch who visits Claire (Julie Bowen) and asks for advice about what to do and how to confront Cam. Claire suggests that he continue to act happy and surprised for Cam until the phase passes. Following their conversation, Cam shows up at Mitch's business lunch and embarrasses him by dancing with him and sharing stories about him with his co-workers. Mitch confronts Cam, and Cam admits that he misses the time when there was no parenting or work between their relationship. Everything is settled when Mitch promises that he will be more romantic for his husband in the future.

Meanwhile, Claire, Phil (Ty Burrell), Haley (Sarah Hyland), and Luke (Nolan Gould) have enjoyed a perfect summer. Everything is peaceful, until Alex (Ariel Winter) comes back home from helping the poor build houses, and everything instantly turns catastrophic. The Dunphys obviously notice a difference in the family's behavior when Alex is and is not around the house, so they do everything they can to send Alex back so they can enjoy the summer's harmony even more. After Alex notices what they try to do, she confronts them and decides to go back since clearly no-one wants her around anymore. Just before she is scheduled to leave, Alex stops a house fire, due to Clarie drying her book and reveals to Haley that she was accidentally broadcasting live over the internet everything she did in front of her computer throughout the entire summer, and stops the whole family from being poisoned by an improperly prepared rhubarb pie. After this, the family realizes that they indeed need Alex to stay and protect them.

Gloria (Sofia Vergara) notices that Jay (Ed O'Neill) does not put a lot of effort into the way he looks lately and is hurt by that. Given that she always tries her best to look good for her husband, she expects the same from him. After confronting him, Jay explains that he does not really care for the way she looks and finds her beautiful no matter what. To prove him wrong, Gloria goes out with him on a business lunch looking hideous. Jay realizes that looks are important and confronts Gloria, telling her that he does not want to be the old guy that tries too hard. Gloria, saddened by such a thing, tells Jay that she married him for the way he looks, not his money, and does not want him to change for anybody.

== Reception ==
=== Ratings ===
In its original run "The Long Honeymoon" attracted an audience of 11.38 million people.

=== Reviews ===
"The Long Honeymoon" received positive reviews.

Joshua Alston from The A.V. Club gave the episode a B grade, saying "It's unlikely the episode will rank in the top tier of season 6—probably no Emmy tape in its future—but it performs solidly and none of its three plots is disastrous. It plays with some fun, mischievous story ideas, and it's pretty funny throughout. Modern Family's B-game is far from perfect, and probably shouldn't be breathing the same oxygen as Louie, but what it does, it still does well".

Leigh Raines from TV Fanatic rated the episode with 4/5. "Well it turns out that the happy Dunphy clan was also clueless. Alex may have brought a little bit of bad luck, but she also brought a lot of smarts".
