= Geofrey Hildrew =

American film editor and director

- Born: Allentown, Pennsylvania
- Occupations: editor; director
- Years active: 1996 - present
- Agents: Brady Torgeson / Independent Artist Group (Talent); Nathan DeRemer / Independent Artist Group (Literary)
- Website: geofreyhildrew.com

Geofrey Hildrew, ACE, BFE, is an American film and television editor and director. Noteworthy credits include the Netflix limited series Painkiller, as well as editing and directing all seven seasons of ABC's fantasy drama, Once Upon a Time. He served as editor and executive producer for the feature film Things Never Said, collaborating with writer/director Charles Murray. Additionally, he edited the thrillers Careful What You Wish For and, his second collaboration with Charles Murray, The Devil You Know.

== Life and career ==
Geofrey was born in Allentown, Pennsylvania and grew up in Hershey, Pennsylvania. He holds a Bachelor's degree in English Literature from Columbia University and a Master's degree in Film and TV Production from the University of Southern California.

During his time in New York, Geofrey worked as a development intern at Martin Scorsese's Cappa Productions, under the mentorship of Barbara De Fina. Subsequently, he relocated to Los Angeles to pursue his graduate studies and continued in development at The Steve Tisch Company.

At present, Geofrey resides in Los Angeles, where he continues to make significant contributions to the world of film and television. He is an active member of the American Cinema Editors, where he is an Associate Board member. He currently serves as Co-Chair of the Membership Committee.

== Filmography ==
Year	Title	Role	Note
2027	Joseph of Egypt	Editor	4 episodes
2026	NCIS: New York	Editor	1 episode (Pilot)
2025	The Bondsman	Editor	4 episodes
2024	American Sports Story: Aaron Hernandez	Editor	2 episodes
2023	Painkiller	Editor	3 episodes
2023	Carnival Row	Editor	1 episode
2022	The Devil You Know	Editor	Feature film
2021	True Story	Editor	3 episodes
2020	Amazing Stories	Editor	1 episode
2019	The Walking Dead	Editor	1 episode
2019	For the People	Editor	2 episodes
2017 - 2019	The Tick	Editor	6 episodes
2011 - 2018	Once Upon a Time	Director / Editor	54 episodes (Editor) 3 episodes (Director)
2016	Dead of Summer	Editor	2 episodes
2015	Extant	Editor	2 episodes
2015	Careful What You Wish For	Editor	Feature film
2013	Once Upon a Time in Wonderland	Editor	1 episode (Pilot)
2013	Things Never Said	Executive Producer / Editor	Feature film
2012	Beauty and the Beast: A Dark Tale	Editor	1 episode (Pilot)
2012	Underemployed	Editor	1 episode (Pilot)
2011	Identity	Editor	1 episode (Pilot)
2009 - 2011	V	Editor	8 episodes
2011	Royal Reunion	Editor	Short film
2007 - 2009	Dirty Sexy Money	Editor	8 episodes
2007	Day Break	Editor	1 episode
2004	Big Time	Writer / Director / Editor / Executive Producer	Short film
