= The Cold (Modern Family) =

- Modern Family episode
- Episode no.: Season 6 Episode 3
- Directed by: Jim Hensz
- Written by: Rick Wiener; Kenny Schwartz
- Production code: 6ATM03
- Original air date: October 8, 2014

Guest appearances
- Adam DeVine as Andy; Robert Desiderio as Alan Ferguson; Aubree Young as Sydney

Episode chronology
← Previous "Do Not Push"	Next → "Marco Polo"
- Modern Family season 6

"The Cold" is the third episode of the sixth season of the American sitcom Modern Family, and the series' 123rd episode overall. It originally aired on October 8, 2014. The episode was written by Rick Wiener & Kenny Schwartz and directed by Jim Hensz.

== Plot ==
Almost everybody has been ill and they all blame it on Mitchell and Cameron. Phil (Ty Burrell) notices, while watching the video tape of Mitchell (Jesse Tyler Ferguson) and Cameron's (Eric Stonestreet) wedding, that he was the one who caused the illness, due to him being sick: he sneezed on the cake, he sneezed on the champagne that Mitchell drank and he sneezed in a tissue that Mitchell used to clean himself. As everybody is healed, it is now Claire's (Julie Bowen) turn to be ill. Not wanting to be discovered as "patient zero", Phil asks Luke (Nolan Gould) to help him edit the video without ruining Jay's speech and Luke agrees to do it. They plan to add new sequences in order to minimize the incident, Luke must laugh and Phil must react to Jay's speech. However, the result is not what they hoped for: Luke's laugh is not what Phil expected, Phil appears at a table, while another Phil appears in the background, walking and eating an apple and Luke uses Phil's sneezed tissue. Luke decides that honesty is the best option and urges Phil to confess during the dinner when the whole family will watch the video.

Jay (Ed O' Neill) asks Claire to meet a client for lunch, which she agrees despite her being sick and suffering. Until she gets to meet the client, she regrets her decision when she begins to suffer from vertigo. She manages to meet the client but she passes out when he asks her for a lunch, which will take place in the revolving rooftop of the hotel.

Meanwhile, Haley (Sarah Hyland) does not want to admit to Alex (Ariel Winter) her true feelings about Andy (Adam DeVine), feelings that she even does not want to admit to herself. After a conversation she has with Alex, she decides to talk to Andy who tells her that he is glad they did not kiss the day of her uncle's wedding, because that would crush her. Haley, being sure that the one that would be crushed would be him, she kisses him. The kiss seems to not affect Andy at all, something that it is not the same for Haley.

Cameron has an important football game at school and has to decide if he has to bench Manny (Rico Rodriguez) or not. Manny tries to make his best but fails. Cameron decides to bench him despite knowing that Gloria (Sofía Vergara) will not be happy with his decision, even if the team ends up winning the game. Later on, Gloria benches Cam as well during the family dinner not allowing him to eat. Manny confesses that his stress comes from his mother who always idealizes him and that he did not want to disappoint her.

In the meantime, Mitchell meets Lily's (Aubrey Anderson-Emmons) new friend Sydney (Aubree Young). He is surprised to discover that Sydney happens to be better than Lily in various activities such as playing the piano or painting. He makes the mistake to call Sydney "a know it all" making her start crying. He tries to apologize, but aggravates the situation until Sydney's mom comes to pick her up and she is mad at him.

As the whole family is gathered for the dinner, Phil has to show the video. When they play it, everyone feels uncomfortable with themselves and they fast forward it: Mitchell's horrible dancing, Cameron's crying face, Claire being hammered and Jay appears to be sweating under his armpit while speaking. Phil takes the opportunity and says that he can edit the video and cut out all the moments that make them feel embarrassed, something that fits him too since that way, no one will find out that he was the one who spread the virus to the whole family, but Lily is the only one who knows.

During the end-credits, Cameron tells Mitchell several times to come to bed, but Mitchell is watching the video of him dancing, which causes him to be shocked.

== Reception ==
=== Ratings ===
In its original American broadcast, "The Cold" was watched by 10.30 million; down by 0.26 from the previous episode.

=== Reviews ===
The episode received positive reviews.

Joshua Alston from The A.V. Club gave the episode a B grade, stating that it was an improvement over the previous episode. Alston also praised the Haley-Andy storyline, saying: "Part of me wishes there was another way to do the gradual build of a romantic relationship between an unlikely pair, but if this is the only way to do it, Modern Family is doing it pretty well".

Leigh Raines of TV Fanatic rated the episode with 4.5/5, stating that in the episode "all tied together nicely, with a bunch of great Modern Family quotes". Raines also praised the Haley-Andy storyline, labeling it her "favorite part".
