= Connection Lost =

Episode of the American sitcom Modern Family

- Modern Family episode
- Claire Dunphy (Julie Bowen) communicates with her family over FaceTime
- Episode no.: Season 6 Episode 16
- Directed by: Steven Levitan
- Written by: Steven Levitan; Megan Ganz
- Production code: 6ARG12
- Original air date: February 25, 2015

Guest appearances
- Reid Ewing as Dylan; Adam DeVine as Andy

Episode chronology
← Previous "Fight or Flight"	Next → "Closet? You'll Love It!"
- Modern Family season 6

"Connection Lost" is the 16th episode of the sixth season of the American sitcom Modern Family. It originally aired on ABC on February 25, 2015. The episode was written by Steven Levitan and Megan Ganz, with the former also directing. It focuses on Claire, the uptight matriarch of the Dunphy family, as she waits for a flight while trying to contact her eldest daughter, Haley. Unable to reach her, she asks her family where she might be. A series of revelations leads her to believe that Haley is married and pregnant.

"Connection Lost" is presented through Claire's laptop screen, featuring the use of various applications like FaceTime and iMessage. Levitan developed the concept during a FaceTime call with his daughter and later drew inspiration from the Canadian screenlife film Noah (2013). Levitan and Ganz created the elements of Claire's laptop screen from scratch, incorporating numerous inside jokes and easter eggs. Apple Inc. provided the show with several devices and gave no compensation for the use of its products. Filming took place in late 2014; post-production took four months—considerably longer than usual—requiring the editors and motion graphics producers to recreate a computer interface.

"Connection Lost" received positive reviews from critics, with praise for its concept, writing, and humor. Several publications have also ranked it as one of Modern Family's best episodes. The episode won the Primetime Emmy Award for Outstanding Sound Mixing for a Comedy or Drama Series (Half-Hour) and Animation and was nominated for the Writers Guild of America Award for Episodic Comedy.

== Plot ==
While waiting for her flight at O'Hare Airport, Claire (Julie Bowen)—the uptight matriarch of the Dunphy family—attempts to contact her eldest daughter, Haley (Sarah Hyland), after a fight they had. Claire video-calls her husband, Phil (Ty Burrell), who says that Haley slept over at a friend's house. Meanwhile, Claire's younger daughter, Alex (Ariel Winter), sends drafts of her college essay for proofreading, but Claire ignores them. Claire video-calls her brother, Mitchell (Jesse Tyler Ferguson), and his husband, Cameron (Eric Stonestreet), to inquire about Haley's whereabouts. She learns that Haley borrowed a suit the night before. Mitchell and Cameron's daughter, Lily (Aubrey Anderson-Emmons), mentions that Haley had been talking to her ex-boyfriend Dylan (Reid Ewing), which surprises Claire, as she was unaware that the two were still in contact.

Claire uses a sock puppet account to check Haley's Facebook, which lists her relationship status as "Married". Assuming Haley has married Dylan, she calls him, only to learn her fears are unfounded. Unable to reach Haley, Claire hacks Haley's iCloud account to track her phone, despite Alex's disapproval. When Google Maps shows Haley's phone near a wedding chapel in Las Vegas, Claire panics, having no idea who Haley could have married.

Claire learns that Andy (Adam DeVine), a family friend, is also in Las Vegas for a wedding. She concludes that Haley has secretly married him. When a copy of the book What to Expect When You're Expecting arrives for Haley at the Dunphy household, Claire fears that her daughter is pregnant with Andy's baby. Overwhelmed, she opens a slideshow of Haley's childhood pictures, which makes her emotional, and video-calls her father, Jay (Ed O'Neill), to apologize for eloping at Haley's age. Jay reassures her by noting that Claire's eloping led to a happy family.

Claire finally receives a call from Haley, who has just awakened at the Dunphy household. Haley clarifies that she is neither married nor pregnant, explaining that the suit was for a friend's wedding, she left her phone in Andy's car, her Facebook status was a joke about a "Cronut", and the pregnancy book was for her boss's fashion line. When Haley questions how Claire accessed her Facebook and tracked her phone, Claire pretends to lose the connection and ends the call.

== Production ==
=== Background and writing ===
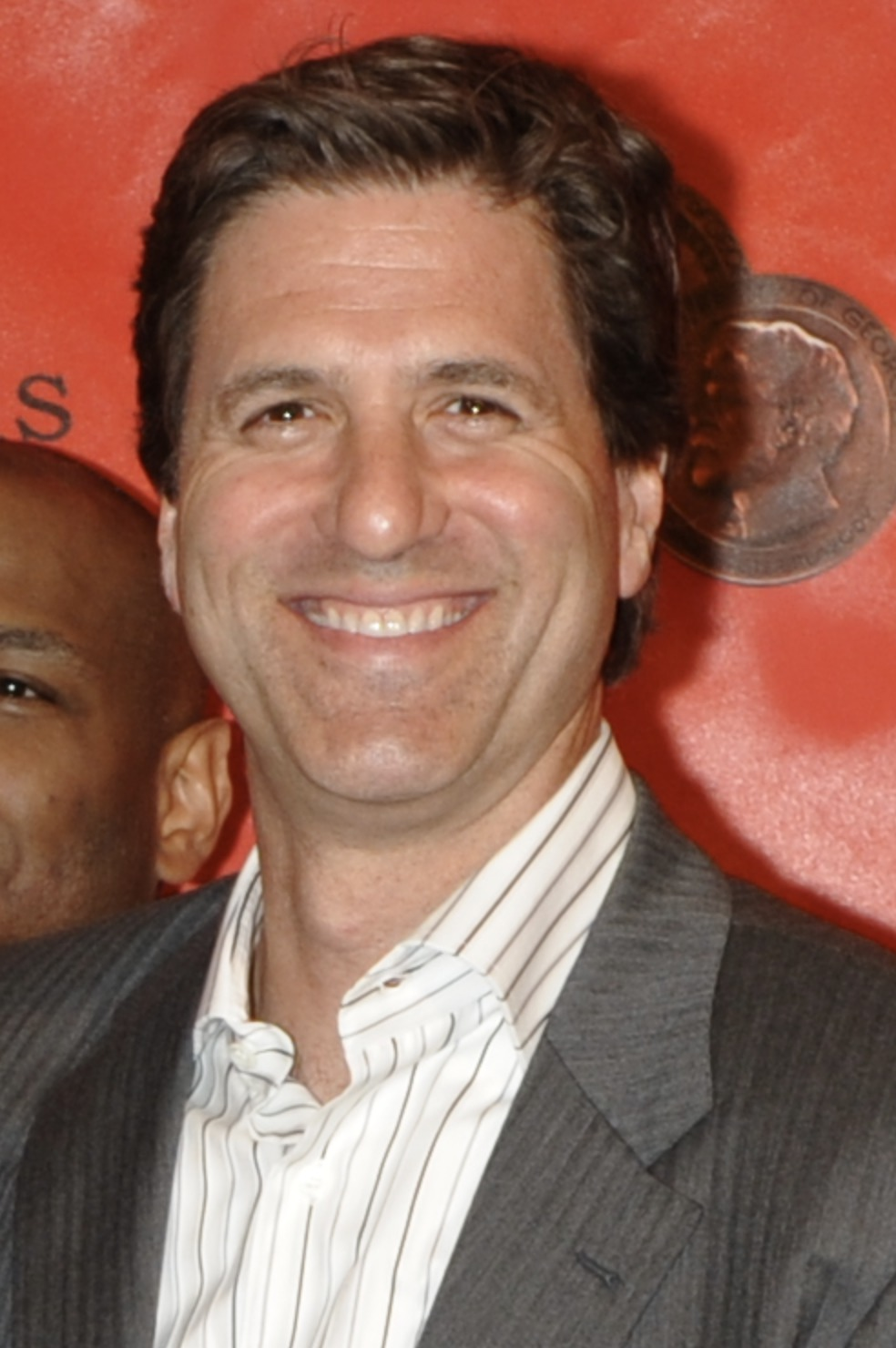
Steven Levitan, the episode's director and co-writer, developed the concept while using various functions on his laptop simultaneously.

Modern Family is an American sitcom conceived by Christopher Lloyd and Steven Levitan while sharing stories of their own families. It features an ensemble cast and is presented in a mockumentary style. The show was renewed for a sixth season in May 2014; Levitan stated that with this season, the writing team sought to maintain audience satisfaction and revitalize the series. To this end, they thought of ways to experiment with the episode formats and narrative structures.

"Connection Lost" is presented through Claire's laptop screen as she uses FaceTime, iMessage, and other social networking services to communicate with her family, an approach that departs from Modern Family's typical format. Levitan developed the episode's concept while using his laptop to video-call his daughter, browse websites, and check his email simultaneously. His daughter later sent him the Canadian short film Noah (2013), which takes place on the computer screen of a teenage boy who experiences a breakup through message apps. The film provided him with the "proof of concept" that such an approach could maintain an audience's attention and sustain a complex narrative.

Levitan co-wrote "Connection Lost" with Megan Ganz. They needed a storyline that would justify the screen-based format while still involving the main cast; Levitan "half expected it to fail", since they struggled to find a sustainable narrative. The episode was ultimately set with Claire at the airport just before her flight, to create a sense of urgency and opportunities for humor. According to Ganz, the screen-based format allowed for different comedy styles. Claire's laptop screen includes many inside jokes and Easter eggs, including Croctopus 4, a reference to a fictional film that appears in the season two episode "Our Children, Ourselves".

Due to the unconventional format, editor Tony Orcena and motion graphics producer John Brown contributed to the pre-production process earlier than usual. They needed to plan all visual content based on the editing that would occur later. Orcena stated that because the episode incorporated very few cuts, they needed to ensure that "what you do in the first seconds" did not become confusing in the next seven minutes. To create an authentic atmosphere, every digital element, including articles and emails, was created from scratch. For Alex's college essay, Ganz wrote a satirical version that attempts to "say the least amount of information in the most amount of words". "Connection Lost" took certain artistic liberties with the technology. Claire calls people simultaneously on FaceTime and accesses Google Street View using Apple Maps—both of which were not possible at the time. Furthermore, according to Ganz, the new format allowed for different comedy styles.

Levitan contacted Noah creators Patrick Cederberg and Walter Woodman for assistance, but they were unavailable due to their involvement in another project. The producers decided to use Apple devices due to their familiarity and recognizability to audiences. After the producers notified Apple Inc. of their plans, the company—which had an ongoing relationship with Modern Family—provided iPhones, iPads, MacBook Pros, and a 12-core Mac Pro. The show's team did not receive payment for their use of the products, with Levitan saying: "There's no product placement or anything. This just came from life, and it made sense." Before filming, extensive run-throughs were conducted with crew members to develop a proof of concept. During this period, they also troubleshot and explored methods of avoiding filming unusable footage of the ceiling or air.

=== Filming and post-production ===
"Connection Lost" was filmed in late 2014. Levitan, who directed, called it Modern Family's "most labor-intensive" episode to date. To allow sufficient time for post-production, Levitan and his crew had to accelerate their filming schedule; they shot 95 percent of the episode within two days. The producers intended to shoot the episode as a screen recording on the Mac, but the quality was insufficient when displayed on a high-definition television screen. Instead, it was filmed with iPhone 6s, iPads, and MacBook Pros, because the creators believed it looked more realistic than recording and later modifying higher-quality footage. Although FaceTime calls use the front cameras, producers opted to film with the iPhone's higher-quality back cameras. The episode was shot using the Advanced Video Coding video compression standard.

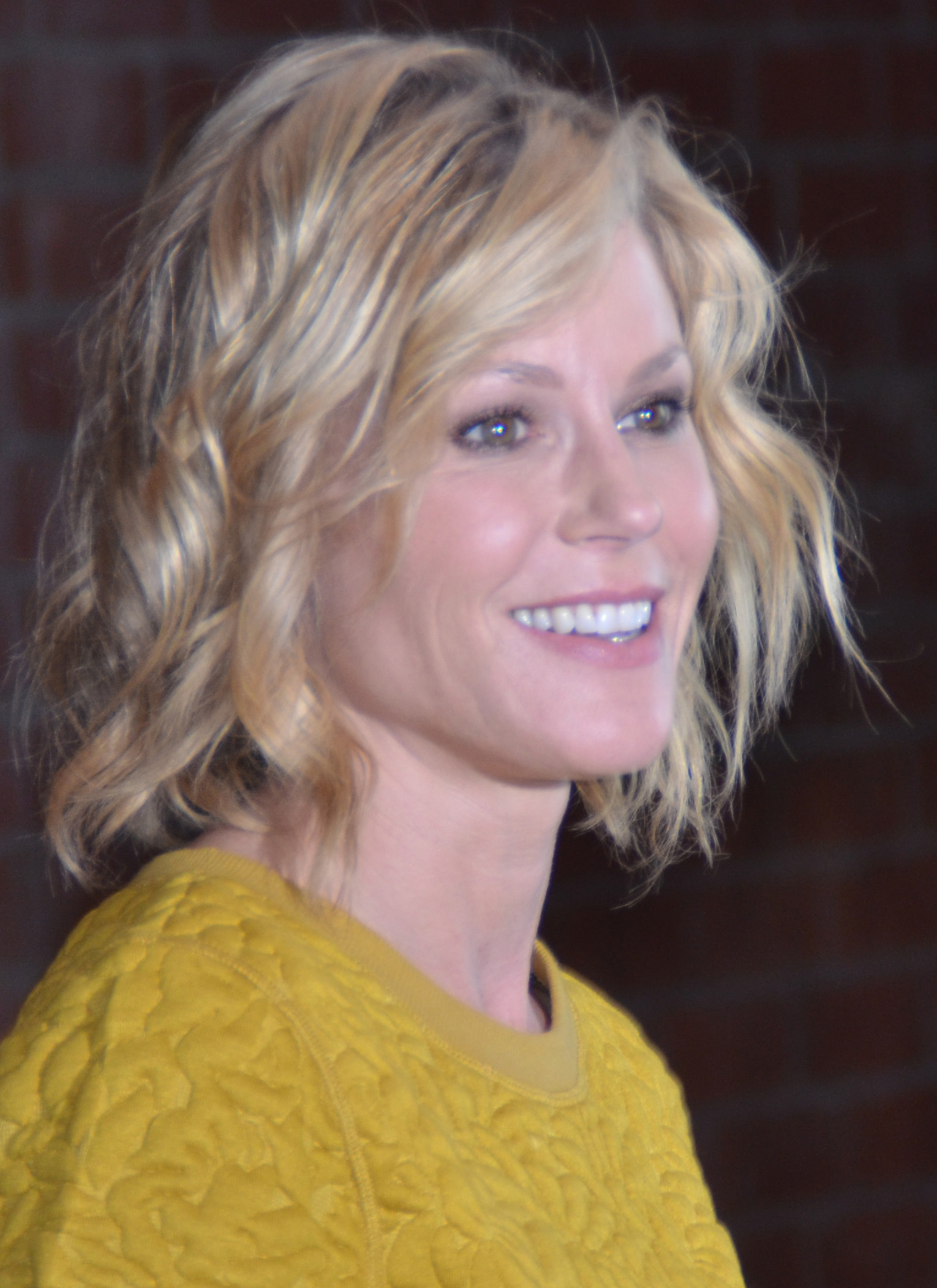
Julie Bowen, who portrays Claire, filmed the episode alone.

During filming, the actors were supposed to hold the recording devices. To avoid recording the ceiling and other surrounding objects, however, the camera operators held the devices instead, while the actors positioned their hands beside the camera operators', mimicking the appearance of a selfie. Claire's computer occasionally displays three separate calls; to give the impression that the characters were all communicating on FaceTime, their scenes were filmed all at once, with three sets being used simultaneously. Bowen filmed her scenes alone in a curtained-off section of the sound stage against a green screen, using an earpiece to hear the other actors. To record shots of Bowen facing the computer, the crew positioned an iPhone atop the Mac's camera. This resulted in a more even eyeline for Bowen and clearer footage. As she could not see the other actors, she used monitors and tape to inform her eyeline.

The post-production process took four months, quadruple its usual length. The team used the editing application Media Composer to encode the footage into the Apple ProRes compression format before importing it into Adobe After Effects, a digital effects and motion graphics software. Orcena used the Mac Pro to edit, as the bins on his Avid computer were so large that they broke the autosave feature. Each act was designed to appear as a single continuous shot with no visible cuts. The team used several methods to conceal editing and cuts within a scene, including simulating connection issues (allowing them to switch between takes), moving the camera, and morphing from one shot into another. The episode was not color graded, except for greenscreen shots of Bowen.

To simulate a computer screen with up to nine open windows, editors and motion graphics producers had to merge the footage with visual effects. They also needed to recreate the entire Mac interface, particularly the OS X Yosemite version, with Brown reproducing and reanimating the interface at a resolution of up to four times the standard one. Brown and Orcena knew of the visual techniques required from working on Google campaigns, but they worried that employing them in a 22-minute television episode could become "very cumbersome and time-consuming". To make sure the episode remained up-to-date, the crew had to keep up with modifications to Yosemite during its beta stage, which Brown said was "frustrating".

== Reception ==
=== Ratings ===
In the United States, "Connection Lost" aired on February 25, 2015, on ABC as the 16th episode of the sixth season. During its original American broadcast, the episode was watched by 9.32 million viewers and received a 3.4 rating (Note: The rating of a program is the estimated portion of the specified group watching the program, expressed as a percentage.) among adults aged 18–49. Its rating was a 0.3 increase from the previous week and Modern Family's highest since November 19, 2014. The episode placed second in its time slot in both viewership and rating, behind Fox's music drama television series Empire. After factoring in seven-day DVR viewership, the episode gained 5 million viewers and 2.1 rating points, for a total of 14.3 million viewers and a 5.5 rating in the 18–49 demographic. This viewership increase was the show's highest since November 2014.

=== Reviews ===
"Connection Lost" received positive reviews from television critics. The Motion Picture Association described it as "one of the most discussed comedy episodes of 2015". Gwen Ihnat of The A.V. Club called it "one of the most entertaining episodes in recent memory", gave it a grade of "B", and wrote that the episode restored the show's "chemistry" by featuring the full main cast. Vulture writer Daniel Kurland said it was "without a doubt the most ambitious and stylistic the series has ever gotten". Similarly, Vox's Brandon Ambrosino and Quartz's Jason Lynch stated that "Connection Lost" was representative of the creative risks Modern Family was taking during its sixth season.

Reviewers also remarked that the screen-based format complemented the narrative and humor. Writing for Slate, Jay Deshpande praised the use of multitasking as a unique narrative device, while Anick Jesdanun of the Associated Press said that the episode's storytelling benefited from jokes and plot twists within the digital format, setting it apart from Modern Family's typical mockumentary-style humor. The writing received praise as well, with Ambrosino describing the script as "a knockout" and asserting that it sustained action and audience engagement. He and Kurland also praised the attention to character development.

The use of Apple products in "Connection Lost" drew mixed reactions. While Ihnat criticized the episode as resembling a "giant infomercial", other critics opined that the product placement was well incorporated into the narrative. Lynch described the product integration as "truly organic", saying that it contrasted with the promotional stunts often seen in television. Kurland commented that the use of technology occasionally felt heavy-handed, such as a scene where Claire nostalgically views baby pictures while listening to music on iTunes. However, he also argued that the devices served as "astute reflections of the characters", enhancing the authenticity of their interactions. Jesdanun remarked that any initial skepticism about the Apple-centric concept "quickly dissipated" due to the episode's strong execution.

According to Vulture, "Connection Lost" is often considered Modern Family's best episode and is the show's highest-rated episode on the online database IMDb. It has topped rankings by /Film and Rolling Stone Brasil and appeared on top-episode lists by Entertainment Weekly (2nd), The Mary Sue (9th), the Chicago Sun-Times (10th), and The Indian Express (10th).

=== Awards and nominations ===
At the 67th Primetime Creative Arts Emmy Awards, "Connection Lost" won Outstanding Sound Mixing for a Comedy or Drama Series (Half-Hour) and Animation, marking Modern Family's third win in the category after "En Garde" and "Dude Ranch"; it was also the show's sixth sound mixing Emmy nomination. It also received the Cinema Audio Society Award for Outstanding Achievement in Sound Mixing for Television Series – Half Hour and was nominated for the Writers Guild of America Award for Episodic Comedy.
