= Elimu Nelson =

American actor

- Born: Elimu Nelson; July 6, 1973 (age 53); Orange, New Jersey, U.S.
- Occupation: Actor
- Years active: 1997–present
- Height: 6 ft 2 in (188 cm)

Elimu Nelson (pronounced Ee-lii-muu, meaning knowledge and education in Swahili; born July 6, 1973) is an American actor. His latest film in which he has a major role is Love Don't Cost a Thing. He has had supporting roles in movies such as Dance Flick, Love & Sex, The Hard Easy, and Unspeakable.

He has made television guest-starring appearances on Pacific Blue, Undressed, JAG, The Practice and City of Angels and the TNT feature Passing Glory.

== Early life ==
Nelson was born in Orange, New Jersey of African American descent, but raised in Milton, Massachusetts. The elder of two, he excelled in basketball and soccer at an early age. Elimu attended Milton High School and graduated in 1991. Elimu then graduated from Syracuse with a Bachelor of Science in Speech Communication, with a concentration in African American Studies and Spanish. After graduation he made his way to Los Angeles after a brief stint in NYC. Upon arriving in LA he hit the ground running with some commercial work and guest appearances on television shows such as: Pacific Blue, Undressed, JAG, The Practice and City of Angels. He also guest starred in The Shield as Derrick Tripp. He is currently working on future projects and living in Burbank, CA.

== Filmography ==
- Passing Glory (1999) (TV) as Touché
- Love & Sex (2000) as Jerome Davis
- What About Your Friends: Weekend Getaway (2002) as Nikko
- The Shield (2002) as Derrick Tripp
- Love Don't Cost a Thing (2003) as Dru Hilton
- The Hard Easy (2005) as Stephen McKinley
- Final Destination 3 (2006)
- Private Practice (2007) (TV) as Greg O'Brien - In Which Sam Receives an Unexpected Visitor...
- Unspeakable (2007) as Neal Knox
- Dance Flick (2009) as Prison Guard
- Fugue (2010) as Terry
- The Game (2012) (TV) as Adisa Edwards - The Black People Episode
- My Favorite Five (2015) as Peter
- Modern Family (2015) (TV) as Officer Clemons - The Big Guns
