= Closet? You'll Love It! =

- Modern Family episode
- Episode no.: Season 6 Episode 17
- Directed by: Ryan Case
- Written by: Elaine Ko
- Production code: 6ARG11
- Original air date: March 4, 2015

Guest appearances
- Adam DeVine as Andy; Robbie Amell as Chase; Jeremy Scott Johnson as Andrew; Matt McGrath as Simon; Laura Ashley Samuels as Beth; Michael Bunin as Director; Joe Mande as Ben; Millie Bobby Brown as Lizzie

Episode chronology
← Previous "Connection Lost"	Next → "Spring Break"
- Modern Family season 6

"Closet? You'll Love It!" is the seventeenth episode of the sixth season of the American sitcom Modern Family, and the series' 137th episode overall. It originally aired on March 4, 2015. The episode was directed by Ryan Case and written by Elaine Ko.

In the episode, Lily prepares to sing at her school's talent show, but her terrible singing voice causes Cameron and Mitchell to interfere. Jay wants to re-shoot an old and inappropriate commercial for the closet company, leading to a fight with Claire. Luke, Manny and Phil try to destroy a drone that spies on Gloria. Andy is in hospital after an appendectomy, leading Haley to make a surprise confession while he sleeps.

"Closet? You'll Love It!" received mixed reviews from the critics with some of them praising Haley and Andy's storyline.

== Plot ==
Cameron (Eric Stonestreet) tries to distract his "tone deaf daughter" by over scheduling her entire day so she can miss her talent show. After Mitchell (Jesse Tyler Ferguson) protests, Cameron is up to find a mutual solution that ends up being him singing "Kung Fu Fighting" and Lily (Aubrey Anderson-Emmons) yelling, dressed in a karate gi. Mitchell quickly comes to learn that the only reason Cameron is skeptical toward Lily’s performance is because of his nemesis, Andrew (Jeremy Scott Johnson), who will attend the talent show as well, to support his child. Mitchell puts the foot down and decides that Lily will be performing at the talent show, with or without Cameron’s support. At the talent show, after a powerful performance by Lily's classmate and Andrew revoking his daughter from the show, the couple decides to repeal Lily’s performance as well.

Claire (Julie Bowen) is assigned to create a new advertisement for the family business when the competitor company releases a new, catchy ad. After contacting her father, she learns that Jay (Ed O'Neill) has already decided to re-shoot the company's old commercial that he did back in the days. In the old commercial, Jay appears at the end pronouncing a slogan that reads "Closet? You’ll Love It!" whose meaning no one can understand. Claire expresses her concern about the commercial failing to reach the popularity it once did, but Jay decides to dismiss her skepticism and go on with it. During the shootings, the crew express their dislike from a "marketing standpoint" but no one wants to tell Jay about it and they ask Claire to inform Jay about the change of the concept. Claire ends up fighting with Jay about it and she tells him that everyone thinks he is grumpy, even his grandchildren, something that leads Jay to be smiling all the time to prove that he is not grumpy.

In the meantime, Phil (Ty Burrell) and Luke (Nolan Gould) arrive at Jay's to hang out with Manny (Rico Rodriguez) and Gloria (Sofía Vergara) by the pool. While Gloria enjoys the sun in her swim suit, a drone flies around her spying her and recording her with its camera. Phil, Luke and Manny try to destroy the drone or drift it away but a series of events leads to a video of Phil exposing his genitals being uploaded on YouTube and going viral. The three of them take it personally and they want to find the source that controls the drone by following it on bicycles, including a pink sparkly bicycle borrowed by Manny from Lizzie (Millie Bobby Brown), leading to a bike crash and another video being uploaded on YouTube with their failure. After that, they are determined to break the camera by throwing balls at the drone while Jay joins their attempt. Finally, the drone is destroyed by Gloria who shoots it with a gun from the balcony, leading the men to believe that they are the ones who took it down.

Meanwhile, Haley (Sarah Hyland), Chase (Robbie Amell) and Andy (Adam DeVine) are on a double date but Andy’s girlfriend, Beth (Laura Ashley Samuels), fails to appear once again, which makes Haley even more suspicious if her being Andy's girlfriend is only in his mind. Later on, Andy ends up in the hospital with appendicitis and Haley rushes to his side. At the hospital, Andy is on drugs and falls asleep which gives Haley the opportunity to confess her feelings towards him right before Beth walks in. Haley, stunned seeing her there, leaves the room and Andy opens his eyes revealing that he was not sleeping while Haley was talking to him.

== Reception ==
=== Ratings ===
The episode was watched by an audience of 9.61 million people, up by 0.29 from the previous episode.

=== Reviews ===
The episode received positive reviews.

Gwen Ihnat of The A.V. Club awarded the episode an A− saying that it was another stellar episode. "The episode offers everything we watch Modern Family for. [...] [the] sixth season can also offer a cast at the top of its game, that absolutely knows how to play off of each other".

Lisa Fernandes of Next Projection rated the episode with 7.9/10 concluding that "Modern Family continues to be the ultimate mixed bag, giving us the worst and best a sitcom can offer in the same season. This episode is an improvement over last week’s, but continues to display flaws and imperfections." Fernandes praised the storyline of Haley and Andy saying that it "is the best thing [the show] has done since the kids have started to age".

Ashley Bissette Sumerel of TV Fanatic rated the episode with 3.5/5 saying that it offered plenty of hilarious moments, but there was something lacking. She further went on to praise the Haley and Andy's storyline, saying it is "something [she's] excited to see moving forward" and labeling their conclusion as "a touching moment that may just be setting us up for a future between these two after all".
