= Las Vegas (Modern Family) =

- Modern Family episode
- Episode no.: Season 5 Episode 18
- Directed by: Gail Mancuso
- Written by: Paul Corrigan; Brad Walsh; Bill Wrubel
- Production code: 5ARG18
- Original air date: March 26, 2014

Guest appearances
- Stephen Merchant as Higgins; Fred Armisen as Langham; Patton Oswalt as Ducky; Elaine Carroll as Female Magician

Episode chronology
← Previous "Other People's Children"	Next → "A Hard Jay's Night"
- Modern Family season 5

"Las Vegas" is the 18th episode of the fifth season of the American sitcom Modern Family, and the series' 114th overall. It was aired on March 26, 2014. The episode was written by Paul Corrigan, Brad Walsh, and Bill Wrubel and directed by Gail Mancuso. The episode is notable for its overlapping story arcs between the characters as they each seek to find their ideal experiences in Las Vegas. This was the only episode of the show to feature only the parent cast.

Sarah Hyland, Ariel Winter, Nolan Gould, Rico Rodriguez, and Aubrey Anderson-Emmons do not appear in this episode.

This episode won Outstanding Directing for a Comedy Series for Gail Mancuso at the 66th Primetime Emmy Awards along with nominations for Outstanding Single-Camera Picture Editing for a Comedy Series and Outstanding Art Direction for a Contemporary Program.

== Plot ==
All the family, except the kids, arrive at Las Vegas for the weekend. Jay (Ed O'Neill) sold the general manager of Mandalay Bay, Burt Tanner (Ray Laska), some closet treatments and Burt gave him free access to the three main adult contingents at the hotel's platinum level rooms in return.

Mitchell (Jesse Tyler Ferguson) runs into an ex-boyfriend of his, Langham (Fred Armisen), who is there with his partner Tim (Jeffrey Nicholas Brown) for their bachelor party. The two of them invite Mitchell and Cam (Eric Stonestreet) to their party but Mitchell declines the offer since he just wants to spend some time at the spa relaxing. Cam goes to the spa with Mitchell but when Mitchell has his massage, he leaves to go to Langham and Tim’s pool party and gets back in time so Mitchell won't notice his absence.

Gloria (Sofía Vergara) and Jay take a walk at the hotel’s mall when Gloria sees Rebarka, the female version of Barkley, the butler dog that Jay bought from Las Vegas on a previous trip of his and she hates. She knows that when Jay sees it, he will want to buy it so she does everything she can to obscure Jay’s view of it. She manages to send Jay to their room to bring her a sweater while she pops into the store to buy Rebarka so they will take it out of the store window. On his way to the room, Jay discovers that their rooms are not on the top floor as Burt initially told him and he becomes intent on moving all of them to the "Excelsior Plus" floor.

Phil (Ty Burrell) and Claire (Julie Bowen) wanted to go to Las Vegas for their own reasons. Phil wants to attend an underground magic society meeting that is headed by Ducky (Patton Oswalt) so he can perform his magic trick of "metamorphosis", while Claire wants to gamble so she can recoup the money she had lost on a previous trip to Las Vegas a few years back. Phil's appointment does not go as expected and he returns disappointed to the hotel while Claire manages to win the money she wanted, leaving her satisfied.

Gloria and Jay return to their room as Jay tells Gloria that they have to convince Burt to give them rooms at the "Excelsior Plus" floor. Gloria opens the door and finds Rebarka there (the store delivered it instead of holding it for her as she asked them). She immediately convinced Jay to order some fine cigars for Burt and sends him away again so she can get rid of the dog. She takes it to Phil and Claire's room that is right next to theirs.

In the meantime, Claire takes Mitchell to play blackjack. At the beginning he is doubtful of the idea, but he eventually likes it and wins some money. Langham sees him, and while they are talking, Mitchell accidentally leaves his room key at the table before he leaves. Langham thinks that he did it on purpose and takes it so he can join Mitchell in his room later. Mitchell gets to the room and orders the butler, Higgins (Stephen Merchant), to prepare a special bath for him and Cam while he goes to get some ice. Langham comes into the room while Mitchell is not there and Higgins, who thinks that he is Mitchell's partner, sends him to the bathroom while telling him that Mitchell is waiting for him.

All the family members are back on the floor and a sequence of events takes place leading to hilarious misunderstandings. Higgins believes that when Phil talks about his wife, he means Rebarka the dog; Mitchell tells Cam that he prepared something special for the two of them but when Cam finds Langham in the tub he misunderstands Mitchell's intentions; Langham shares Cam’s sentiments but still asks them to join him in the tub while also revealing that Cam was at their bachelor party; Claire comes into the room while Mitchell and Cam fight and tells them she has a surprise for them; Langham steps out of the bathroom in a robe, making Claire think she interrupted something, and Mitchell sends Langham to Jay's room because Langham's fiancé is knocking on the door; Jay sees Langham and believes he is Burt, but Gloria tells him that he is not Burt; Langham leaves and goes to Phil's room, where Higgins sees him and believes that he is the "Claire" that Phil is waiting for; Phil escorts Langham out of the room while Gloria enters from the mid-room door to borrow Claire’s hair products, but the towel she is wearing gets snagged in the door; Phil runs into Ducky, who came to tell him that he would like to give him a second chance for his magic trick, but before they get into the room, Gloria runs to the bathroom naked to hide; Phil takes Rebarka in the bathroom before he performs his trick while Jay meets with Burt next door; Ducky is not impressed with Phil's trick but when Gloria gets out of the bathroom dressed as a maid (she took and wore Rebarka's clothes), he believes that the transformation of the fake dog to a hot maid was part of the trick and he gets excited; Gloria returns to her room dressed as a maid at the exact moment when Jay tells Burt that he ordered him a Cuban (meaning a cigar, not a woman); Claire reveals her surprise to Mitchell and Cam, the "Kilty Pleasures" (an all-male revue of half-naked men dressed in Scottish kilts reminiscent of the Chippendales dancers), but instead of going to Cam and Mitchell's room, the dancers went into Jay's as he is in mid-conversation with Burt (Jay ordered scotch but Higgens understood that as "Scots").

Amused at Jay’s “style”, Burt gives him what he wanted: rooms at the "Excelsior Plus" floor, only for Jay to discover a little while later that there is one more floor above the "Excelsior Plus”, which is the "Excelsior Ultra”.

== Reception ==
=== Ratings ===
In its original American broadcast, "Las Vegas" was watched by 10.09 million; up by 0.7 from the previous episode.

DVR Live+7 ratings for Las Vegas increased from 10.09 million to 15.12 million viewers (+50%) and went from a 3.6 to a 5.9 in the 18-49 demo. (+64%).

=== Reviews ===
"Las Vegas" received critical acclaim, with many critics praising the farcical elements incorporated into the episode's final act. This episode was also well received by fans of the show, with "Las Vegas" holding an accumulated score of 9.1 on IMDb, as of August 2022, making it the second highest rated episode of the series.

Joshua Alston of The A.V. Club gave an A rate to the episode saying that it was an interesting episode for a variety of reasons. "'Las Vegas' is the first episode of Modern Family's fifth season that I had especially high hopes for [...] [it] surpassed my expectations. [...] The satisfying crescendo was once Modern Family's bread-and-butter, but the most recent examples haven't worked as well as they once did. That is, until 'Las Vegas,' which boasts a third act that is like a master class in controlled chaos."

Leigh Raines of TV Fanatic rated the episode 5/5 stars and said that the episode was "epic". "[Las Vegas] is one of the ones people will be talking about for years to come. [...] The craziness that was bred between the three rooms in the second half of the episode was the perfect melee to show ol' Burt and get an upgrade. Of course, none of it could have been done without the mix-ups between the rest of the cast."

Madina Papadopoulos from Paste Magazine rated the episode 8.5/10 and described it as a farce. "The farce is an old form of comedy, and regardless of its age, low-brow humor and predictability, it's still an effective way to make us laugh. [...] It takes talented writers to pull off a farce, and Modern Family's execution this week showcased those writers."

Christopher Lawrence of Las Vegas Review Journal gives a positive review and suggests a spin-off based on the episode's butler, Higgins. "Overall, it's a fairly standard episode of Modern Family, full of misunderstandings, sneaking around, bigger misunderstandings, wordplay and giant misunderstandings. But it does, most likely unintentionally, lay the groundwork for a Vegas-based spinoff that would be full of potential. There’s no telling what sorts of trouble Merchant’s Higgins or his clients could get themselves into on a weekly basis, especially if the producers could convince Oswalt to stick around."

== See also ==
- List of television shows set in Las Vegas
