= List of Modern Family episodes =

Modern Family is an American television mockumentary sitcom created by Christopher Lloyd and Steven Levitan for ABC. The series is set in Los Angeles, California and it follows the family lives of Jay Pritchett (Ed O'Neill), his daughter Claire Dunphy (Julie Bowen) and his son Mitchell Pritchett (Jesse Tyler Ferguson).

In the series, Claire and her husband Phil Dunphy (Ty Burrell) have three children named Haley (Sarah Hyland), Alex (Ariel Winter) and Luke (Nolan Gould). Following his divorce from Claire and Mitchell's mother Dede, Jay married a much younger Colombian woman named Gloria Delgado-Pritchett (Sofía Vergara) who has one son from her previous marriage named Manny Delgado (Rico Rodriguez). In the fourth season, Gloria gives birth to Fulgencio "Joe" Pritchett (Jeremy Maguire). At the beginning of the series, Mitchell and his husband Cameron Tucker (Eric Stonestreet) adopted a Vietnamese-born female child named Lily Tucker-Pritchett (Aubrey Anderson-Emmons).

During the course of the series, 250 episodes of Modern Family aired over eleven seasons, between September 23, 2009, and April 8, 2020.

== Series overview ==
Season	Episodes	Originally released		Rank	Average viewers (in millions)
Season	Episodes	First released	Last released	Rank	Average viewers (in millions)
1	24	September 23, 2009	May 19, 2010	36	9.49
2	24	September 22, 2010	May 25, 2011	24	11.89
3	24	September 21, 2011	May 23, 2012	15	12.93
4	24	September 26, 2012	May 22, 2013	18	12.31
5	24	September 25, 2013	May 21, 2014	19	11.79
6	24	September 24, 2014	May 20, 2015	24	11.91
7	22	September 23, 2015	May 18, 2016	36	9.83
8	22	September 21, 2016	May 17, 2017	34	8.79
9	22	September 27, 2017	May 16, 2018	58	7.09
10	22	September 26, 2018	May 8, 2019	65	6.40
11	18	September 25, 2019	April 8, 2020	48	7.10
Special		April 8, 2020		—N/a	—N/a

== Episodes ==
=== Season 1 (2009–10) ===
No. overall	No. in season	Title	Directed by	Written by	Original release date	Prod. code	U.S. viewers (millions)
1	1	"Pilot"	Jason Winer	Steven Levitan & Christopher Lloyd	September 23, 2009	1ARG79	12.61
2	2	"The Bicycle Thief"	Jason Winer	Bill Wrubel	September 30, 2009	1ARG02	9.99
3	3	"Come Fly with Me"	Reginald Hudlin	Dan O'Shannon	October 7, 2009	1ARG04	8.82
4	4	"The Incident"	Jason Winer	Steven Levitan	October 14, 2009	1ARG05	9.35
5	5	"Coal Digger"	Jason Winer	Christopher Lloyd	October 21, 2009	1ARG03	8.66
6	6	"Run for Your Wife"	Jason Winer	Paul Corrigan & Brad Walsh	October 28, 2009	1ARG01	9.33
7	7	"En Garde"	Randall Einhorn	Danny Zuker	November 4, 2009	1ARG06	8.77
8	8	"Great Expectations"	Jason Winer	Joe Lawson	November 18, 2009	1ARG07	9.16
9	9	"Fizbo"	Jason Winer	Paul Corrigan & Brad Walsh	November 25, 2009	1ARG09	7.15
10	10	"Undeck the Halls"	Randall Einhorn	Dan O'Shannon	December 9, 2009	1ARG11	9.67
11	11	"Up All Night"	Michael Spiller	Christopher Lloyd	January 6, 2010	1ARG10	10.22
12	12	"Not in My House"	Chris Koch	Caroline Williams	January 13, 2010	1ARG08	7.83
13	13	"Fifteen Percent"	Jason Winer	Steven Levitan	January 20, 2010	1ARG12	9.83
14	14	"Moon Landing"	Jason Winer	Bill Wrubel	February 3, 2010	1ARG13	9.19
15	15	"My Funky Valentine"	Michael Spiller	Jerry Collins	February 10, 2010	1ARG16	9.84
16	16	"Fears"	Reginald Hudlin	Steven Levitan	March 3, 2010	1ARG18	8.01
17	17	"Truth Be Told"	Jason Winer	Joe Lawson	March 10, 2010	1ARG17	9.02
18	18	"Starry Night"	Jason Winer	Danny Zuker	March 24, 2010	1ARG15	9.18
19	19	"Game Changer"	Kevin Sullivan	Story by : Vanessa McCarthy & Joe Lawson; Teleplay by : Joe Lawson & Alex Herschlag	March 31, 2010	1ARG21	9.51
20	20	"Benched"	Chris Koch	Danny Zuker	April 14, 2010	1ARG20	8.88
21	21	"Travels with Scout"	Seth Gordon	Paul Corrigan & Brad Walsh	April 28, 2010	1ARG14	10.01
22	22	"Airport 2010"	Jason Winer	Dan O'Shannon & Bill Wrubel	May 5, 2010	1ARG19	9.48
23	23	"Hawaii"	Steven Levitan	Paul Corrigan & Brad Walsh	May 12, 2010	1ARG23	10.34
24	24	"Family Portrait"	Jason Winer	Ilana Wernick	May 19, 2010	1ARG22	10.14

=== Season 2 (2010–11) ===
No. overall	No. in season	Title	Directed by	Written by	Original release date	Prod. code	U.S. viewers (millions)
25	1	"The Old Wagon"	Michael Spiller	Bill Wrubel	September 22, 2010	2ARG05	12.67
26	2	"The Kiss"	Scott Ellis	Abraham Higginbotham	September 29, 2010	2ARG04	11.92
27	3	"Earthquake"	Michael Spiller	Paul Corrigan & Brad Walsh	October 6, 2010	2ARG01	11.44
28	4	"Strangers on a Treadmill"	Scott Ellis	Danny Zuker	October 13, 2010	2ARG02	11.45
29	5	"Unplugged"	Michael Spiller	Steven Levitan	October 20, 2010	2ARG06	11.97
30	6	"Halloween"	Michael Spiller	Jeffrey Richman	October 27, 2010	2ARG09	13.14
31	7	"Chirp"	Michael Spiller	Dan O'Shannon	November 3, 2010	2ARG03	12.24
32	8	"Manny Get Your Gun"	Michael Spiller	Story by : Christopher Lloyd; Teleplay by : Danny Zuker	November 17, 2010	2ARG11	12.09
33	9	"Mother Tucker"	Michael Spiller	Paul Corrigan & Brad Walsh	November 24, 2010	2ARG07	10.57
34	10	"Dance Dance Revelation"	Gail Mancuso	Ilana Wernick	December 8, 2010	2ARG08	11.08
35	11	"Slow Down Your Neighbors"	Gail Mancuso	Ilana Wernick	January 5, 2011	2ARG12	11.83
36	12	"Our Children, Ourselves"	Adam Shankman	Dan O'Shannon & Bill Wrubel	January 12, 2011	2ARG10	11.12
37	13	"Caught in the Act"	Michael Spiller	Steven Levitan & Jeffrey Richman	January 19, 2011	2ARG13	10.94
38	14	"Bixby's Back"	Chris Koch	Danny Zuker	February 9, 2011	2ARG16	13.16
39	15	"Princess Party"	Michael Spiller	Elaine Ko	February 16, 2011	2ARG17	10.57
40	16	"Regrets Only"	Dean Parisot	Abraham Higginbotham	February 23, 2011	2ARG14	10.17
41	17	"Two Monkeys and a Panda"	Beth McCarthy-Miller	Carol Leifer	March 2, 2011	2ARG15	10.11
42	18	"Boys' Night"	Chris Koch	Steven Levitan & Jeffrey Richman	March 23, 2011	2ARG20	10.90
43	19	"The Musical Man"	Michael Spiller	Paul Corrigan & Brad Walsh	April 13, 2011	2ARG19	9.61
44	20	"Someone to Watch Over Lily"	Michael Spiller	Bill Wrubel	April 20, 2011	2ARG18	9.95
45	21	"Mother's Day"	Michael Spiller	Dan O'Shannon & Ilana Wernick	May 4, 2011	2ARG21	9.90
46	22	"Good Cop Bad Dog"	Fred Savage	Story by : Abraham Higginbotham; Teleplay by : Abraham Higginbotham & Jeffrey Richman	May 11, 2011	2ARG22	10.15
47	23	"See You Next Fall"	Steven Levitan	Danny Zuker	May 18, 2011	2ARG24	10.30
48	24	"The One That Got Away"	James Bagdonas	Paul Corrigan & Brad Walsh & Dan O'Shannon	May 25, 2011	2ARG23	10.31

=== Season 3 (2011–12) ===
No. overall	No. in season	Title	Directed by	Written by	Original release date	Prod. code	U.S. viewers (millions)
49	1	"Dude Ranch"	Jason Winer	Paul Corrigan & Brad Walsh & Dan O'Shannon	September 21, 2011	3ARG03	14.52
50	2	"When Good Kids Go Bad"	Michael Spiller	Jeffrey Richman	September 21, 2011	3ARG02	14.54
51	3	"Phil on Wire"	Jason Winer	Teleplay by : Danny Zuker; Story by : Bianca Douglas & Danny Zuker	September 28, 2011	3ARG01	13.45
52	4	"Door to Door"	Chris Koch	Bill Wrubel	October 5, 2011	3ARG04	13.24
53	5	"Hit and Run"	Jason Winer	Elaine Ko	October 12, 2011	3ARG06	13.65
54	6	"Go Bullfrogs!"	Scott Ellis	Abraham Higginbotham	October 19, 2011	3ARG07	13.04
55	7	"Treehouse"	Jason Winer	Steven Levitan	November 2, 2011	3ARG08	13.37
56	8	"After the Fire"	Fred Savage	Danny Zuker	November 16, 2011	3ARG09	12.91
57	9	"Punkin Chunkin"	Michael Spiller	Ben Karlin	November 23, 2011	3ARG05	12.72
58	10	"Express Christmas"	Michael Spiller	Cindy Chupack	December 7, 2011	3ARG10	12.20
59	11	"Lifetime Supply"	Chris Koch	Jeffrey Richman & Bill Wrubel	January 4, 2012	3ARG11	14.03
60	12	"Egg Drop"	Jason Winer	Paul Corrigan & Brad Walsh	January 11, 2012	3ARG12	12.12
61	13	"Little Bo Bleep"	Chris Koch	Cindy Chupack	January 18, 2012	3ARG14	11.89
62	14	"Me? Jealous?"	Michael Spiller	Ben Karlin	February 8, 2012	3ARG13	12.90
63	15	"Aunt Mommy"	Michael Spiller	Abraham Higginbotham & Dan O'Shannon	February 15, 2012	3ARG15	11.23
64	16	"Virgin Territory"	Jason Winer	Elaine Ko	February 22, 2012	3ARG17	11.54
65	17	"Leap Day"	Gail Mancuso	Danny Zuker	February 29, 2012	3ARG19	11.63
66	18	"Send Out the Clowns"	Steven Levitan	Steven Levitan & Jeffrey Richman & Bill Wrubel	March 14, 2012	3ARG16	10.60
67	19	"Election Day"	Bryan Cranston	Ben Karlin	April 11, 2012	3ARG20	10.35
68	20	"The Last Walt"	Michael Spiller	Dan O'Shannon & Paul Corrigan & Brad Walsh	April 18, 2012	3ARG21	10.21
69	21	"Planes, Trains and Cars"	Michael Spiller	Paul Corrigan & Brad Walsh	May 2, 2012	3ARG18	10.06
70	22	"Disneyland"	James Bagdonas	Cindy Chupack	May 9, 2012	3ARG22	10.58
71	23	"Tableau Vivant"	Gail Mancuso	Elaine Ko & Jeffrey Richman & Bill Wrubel	May 16, 2012	3ARG23	9.36
72	24	"Baby on Board"	Steven Levitan	Abraham Higginbotham	May 23, 2012	3ARG24	10.07

=== Season 4 (2012–13) ===
No. overall	No. in season	Title	Directed by	Written by	Original release date	Prod. code	U.S. viewers (millions)
73	1	"Bringing Up Baby"	Steven Levitan	Paul Corrigan & Brad Walsh	September 26, 2012	4ARG01	14.44
74	2	"Schooled"	Jeff Melman	Steven Levitan & Dan O'Shannon	October 10, 2012	4ARG03	12.08
75	3	"Snip"	Gail Mancuso	Danny Zuker	October 10, 2012	4ARG02	12.31
76	4	"The Butler's Escape"	Beth McCarthy-Miller	Bill Wrubel	October 17, 2012	4ARG04	12.28
77	5	"Open House of Horrors"	James Bagdonas	Elaine Ko	October 24, 2012	4ARG06	12.52
78	6	"Yard Sale"	Gail Mancuso	Abraham Higginbotham	October 31, 2012	4ARG05	10.62
79	7	"Arrested"	Gail Mancuso	Becky Mann & Audra Sielaff	November 7, 2012	4ARG07	12.43
80	8	"Mistery Date"	Beth McCarthy-Miller	Jeffrey Richman	November 14, 2012	4ARG08	11.89
81	9	"When a Tree Falls"	Steven Levitan	Ben Karlin	November 28, 2012	4ARG09	12.01
82	10	"Diamond in the Rough"	Gail Mancuso	Dan O'Shannon & Becky Mann & Audra Sielaff	December 12, 2012	4ARG11	10.94
83	11	"New Year's Eve"	Fred Goss	Abraham Higginbotham & Jeffrey Richman	January 9, 2013	4ARG13	12.04
84	12	"Party Crasher"	Fred Savage	Danny Zuker & Christopher Lloyd	January 16, 2013	4ARG10	11.01
85	13	"Fulgencio"	Lev L. Spiro	Bill Wrubel	January 23, 2013	4ARG12	10.83
86	14	"A Slight at the Opera"	James Bagdonas	Paul Corrigan & Brad Walsh	February 6, 2013	4ARG14	9.83
87	15	"Heart Broken"	Beth McCarthy-Miller	Danny Zuker	February 13, 2013	4ARG18	10.05
88	16	"Bad Hair Day"	Gail Mancuso	Elaine Ko	February 20, 2013	4ARG16	10.62
89	17	"Best Men"	Steven Levitan	Teleplay by : Dan O'Shannon & Abraham Higginbotham; Story by : Dan O'Shannon & Abraham Higginbotham & Bianca Douglas	February 27, 2013	4ARG15	10.53
90	18	"The Wow Factor"	Steven Levitan	Ben Karlin	March 27, 2013	4ARG17	9.09
91	19	"The Future Dunphys"	Ryan Case	Elaine Ko	April 3, 2013	4ARG20	10.88
92	20	"Flip Flop"	Gail Mancuso	Jeffrey Richman & Bill Wrubel	April 10, 2013	4ARG19	10.38
93	21	"Career Day"	Jim Hensz	Paul Corrigan & Brad Walsh	May 1, 2013	4ARG21	9.64
94	22	"My Hero"	Gail Mancuso	Abraham Higginbotham	May 8, 2013	4ARG22	9.02
95	23	"Games People Play"	Alisa Statman	Teleplay by : Ben Karlin; Story by : Danny Zuker	May 15, 2013	4ARG24	10.03
96	24	"Goodnight Gracie"	Steven Levitan	Steven Levitan & Jeffrey Richman	May 22, 2013	4ARG23	10.01

=== Season 5 (2013–14) ===
No. overall	No. in season	Title	Directed by	Written by	Original release date	Prod. code	U.S. viewers (millions)
97	1	"Suddenly, Last Summer"	James Bagdonas	Jeffrey Richman	September 25, 2013	5ARG01	11.71
98	2	"First Days"	Steven Levitan	Paul Corrigan & Brad Walsh	September 25, 2013	5ARG02	11.65
99	3	"Larry's Wife"	Jeffrey Walker	Bill Wrubel	October 2, 2013	5ARG05	11.12
100	4	"Farm Strong"	Alisa Statman	Elaine Ko	October 9, 2013	5ARG04	10.64
101	5	"The Late Show"	Beth McCarthy-Miller	Abraham Higginbotham	October 16, 2013	5ARG06	10.94
102	6	"The Help"	Jim Hensz	Danny Zuker	October 23, 2013	5ARG07	10.32
103	7	"A Fair to Remember"	Beth McCarthy-Miller	Emily Spivey	November 13, 2013	5ARG09	10.75
104	8	"ClosetCon '13"	Fred Savage	Ben Karlin	November 20, 2013	5ARG08	10.19
105	9	"The Big Game"	Beth McCarthy-Miller	Megan Ganz	December 4, 2013	5ARG03	9.47
106	10	"The Old Man & the Tree"	Bryan Cranston	Paul Corrigan & Brad Walsh	December 11, 2013	5ARG10	10.61
107	11	"And One to Grow On"	Gail Mancuso	Jeffrey Richman	January 8, 2014	5ARG12	9.51
108	12	"Under Pressure"	James Bagdonas	Elaine Ko	January 15, 2014	5ARG11	9.14
109	13	"Three Dinners"	Steven Levitan	Abraham Higginbotham, Steven Levitan & Jeffrey Richman	January 22, 2014	5ARG15	9.59
110	14	"iSpy"	Gail Mancuso	Abraham Higginbotham	February 5, 2014	5ARG13	9.87
111	15	"The Feud"	Ryan Case	Story by : Christopher Lloyd; Teleplay by : Dan O'Shannon	February 26, 2014	5ARG14	8.52
112	16	"Spring-a-Ding-Fling"	Gail Mancuso	Ben Karlin	March 5, 2014	5ARG16	9.22
113	17	"Other People's Children"	Jim Hensz	Megan Ganz	March 12, 2014	5ARG17	9.39
114	18	"Las Vegas"	Gail Mancuso	Paul Corrigan & Brad Walsh & Bill Wrubel	March 26, 2014	5ARG18	10.09
115	19	"A Hard Jay's Night"	Beth McCarthy-Miller	Megan Ganz & Ben Karlin	April 2, 2014	5ARG20	9.00
116	20	"Australia"	Steven Levitan	Elaine Ko & Danny Zuker	April 23, 2014	5ARG21	9.59
117	21	"Sleeper"	Ryan Case	Paul Corrigan, Brad Walsh & Bill Wrubel	April 30, 2014	5ARG22	8.39
118	22	"Message Received"	Jeffrey Walker	Steven Levitan	May 7, 2014	5ARG19	8.55
119	23	"The Wedding (Part 1)"	Steven Levitan	Abraham Higginbotham, Ben Karlin & Jeffrey Richman	May 14, 2014	5ARG23	9.08
120	24	"The Wedding (Part 2)"	Alisa Statman	Megan Ganz, Christopher Lloyd & Dan O'Shannon	May 21, 2014	5ARG24	10.45

=== Season 6 (2014–15) ===
No. overall	No. in season	Title	Directed by	Written by	Original release date	Prod. code	U.S. viewers (millions)
121	1	"The Long Honeymoon"	Beth McCarthy-Miller	Danny Zuker	September 24, 2014	6ARG01	11.38
122	2	"Do Not Push"	Gail Mancuso	Megan Ganz	October 1, 2014	6ARG02	10.56
123	3	"The Cold"	Jim Hensz	Rick Wiener & Kenny Schwartz	October 8, 2014	6ARG03	10.30
124	4	"Marco Polo"	Fred Savage	Elaine Ko	October 15, 2014	6ARG05	9.71
125	5	"Won't You Be Our Neighbor"	Gail Mancuso	Paul Corrigan & Brad Walsh	October 22, 2014	6ARG04	10.16
126	6	"Halloween 3: AwesomeLand"	Gail Mancuso	Paul Corrigan & Brad Walsh & Abraham Higginbotham	October 29, 2014	6ARG06	9.92
127	7	"Queer Eyes, Full Hearts"	Jason Winer	Stephen Lloyd	November 12, 2014	6ARG08	9.83
128	8	"Three Turkeys"	Beth McCarthy-Miller	Jeffrey Richman	November 19, 2014	6ARG09	10.88
129	9	"Strangers in the Night"	Fred Savage	Chuck Tatham	December 3, 2014	6ARG07	9.02
130	10	"Haley's 21st Birthday"	Alisa Statman	Abraham Higginbotham	December 10, 2014	6ARG10	9.69
131	11	"The Day We Almost Died"	James Bagdonas	Danny Zuker	January 7, 2015	6ARG13	9.29
132	12	"The Big Guns"	Jeffrey Walker	Vali Chandrasekaran	January 14, 2015	6ARG14	9.44
133	13	"Rash Decisions"	Jim Hensz	Teleplay by : Daisy Gardner; Story by : Anthony Lombardo & Clint McCray	February 4, 2015	6ARG16	9.87
134	14	"Valentine's Day 4: Twisted Sister"	Fred Savage	Jeffrey Richman	February 11, 2015	6ARG15	9.77
135	15	"Fight or Flight"	Steven Levitan	Abraham Higginbotham	February 18, 2015	6ARG18	8.80
136	16	"Connection Lost"	Steven Levitan	Steven Levitan & Megan Ganz	February 25, 2015	6ARG12	9.32
137	17	"Closet? You'll Love It!"	Ryan Case	Elaine Ko	March 4, 2015	6ARG11	9.61
138	18	"Spring Break"	Gail Mancuso	Paul Corrigan & Brad Walsh	March 25, 2015	6ARG17	8.71
139	19	"Grill, Interrupted"	James Bagdonas	Paul Corrigan & Brad Walsh & Jeffrey Richman	April 1, 2015	6ARG21	9.43
140	20	"Knock 'Em Down"	Beth McCarthy-Miller	Rick Wiener & Kenny Schwartz	April 22, 2015	6ARG20	8.85
141	21	"Integrity"	Chris Koch	Stephen Lloyd & Chuck Tatham	April 29, 2015	6ARG19	8.00
142	22	"Patriot Games"	Alisa Statman	Vali Chandrasekaran	May 6, 2015	6ARG22	8.57
143	23	"Crying Out Loud"	Ryan Case	Megan Ganz & Stephen Lloyd & Chuck Tatham	May 13, 2015	6ARG23	8.13
144	24	"American Skyper"	Steven Levitan	Elaine Ko	May 20, 2015	6ARG24	7.20

=== Season 7 (2015–16) ===
No. overall	No. in season	Title	Directed by	Written by	Original release date	Prod. code	U.S. viewers (millions)
145	1	"Summer Lovin'"	Jim Hensz	Abraham Higginbotham	September 23, 2015	7ARG01	9.46
146	2	"The Day Alex Left for College"	Jeffrey Walker	Danny Zuker	September 30, 2015	7ARG02	8.72
147	3	"The Closet Case"	Beth McCarthy-Miller	Paul Corrigan & Brad Walsh	October 7, 2015	7ARG03	7.99
148	4	"She Crazy"	Gail Mancuso	Elaine Ko	October 14, 2015	7ARG04	7.88
149	5	"The Verdict"	Alisa Statman	Chuck Tatham	October 21, 2015	7ARG05	7.80
150	6	"The More You Ignore Me"	Gail Mancuso	Vali Chandrasekaran	November 11, 2015	7ARG06	8.15
151	7	"Phil's Sexy, Sexy House"	Beth McCarthy-Miller	Stephen Lloyd	November 18, 2015	7ARG08	8.38
152	8	"Clean Out Your Junk Drawer"	Steven Levitan	Steven Levitan	December 2, 2015	7ARG07	7.35
153	9	"White Christmas"	Gail Mancuso	Andy Gordon & Jon Pollack	December 9, 2015	7ARG11	8.20
154	10	"Playdates"	Claire Scanlon	Jeffrey Richman	January 6, 2016	7ARG09	8.35
155	11	"Spread Your Wings"	James Bagdonas	Vanessa McCarthy & Ryan Walls	January 13, 2016	7ARG10	8.17
156	12	"Clean for a Day"	Beth McCarthy-Miller	Paul Corrigan & Brad Walsh	February 10, 2016	7ARG13	7.80
157	13	"Thunk in the Trunk"	Phil Traill	Elaine Ko	February 17, 2016	7ARG12	7.48
158	14	"The Storm"	Jim Bagdonas	Danny Zuker	February 24, 2016	7ARG16	8.10
159	15	"I Don't Know How She Does It"	Ryan Case	Jeffrey Richman	March 2, 2016	7ARG14	8.22
160	16	"The Cover-Up"	Jim Hensz	Chuck Tatham	March 16, 2016	7ARG15	8.14
161	17	"Express Yourself"	Alisa Statman	Abraham Higginbotham	March 23, 2016	7ARG18	7.69
162	18	"The Party"	Steven Levitan	Vali Chandrasekaran	April 6, 2016	7ARG17	7.51
163	19	"Man Shouldn't Lie"	Gail Mancuso	Andy Gordon	April 13, 2016	7ARG19	7.44
164	20	"Promposal"	Ken Whittingham	Stephen Lloyd	May 4, 2016	7ARG20	7.42
165	21	"Crazy Train"	Jim Hensz	Jon Pollack & Ryan Walls	May 11, 2016	7ARG21	7.16
166	22	"Double Click"	Jim Bagdonas	Elaine Ko	May 18, 2016	7ARG22	6.79

=== Season 8 (2016–17) ===
No. overall	No. in season	Title	Directed by	Written by	Original release date	Prod. code	U.S. viewers (millions)
167	1	"A Tale of Three Cities"	Chris Koch	Elaine Ko	September 21, 2016	8ARG01	8.24
168	2	"A Stereotypical Day"	Ryan Case	Vali Chandrasekaran	September 28, 2016	8ARG03	7.41
169	3	"Blindsided"	Jim Hensz	Christy Stratton & Danny Zuker	October 5, 2016	8ARG02	6.97
170	4	"Weathering Heights"	Gail Mancuso	Paul Corrigan & Brad Walsh	October 12, 2016	8ARG04	7.50
171	5	"Halloween IV: Revenge of Rod Skyhook"	Chris Koch	Stephen Lloyd	October 26, 2016	8ARG06	7.38
172	6	"Grab It"	Beth McCarthy-Miller	Jeffrey Richman	November 9, 2016	8ARG05	7.23
173	7	"Thanksgiving Jamboree"	Steven Levitan	Jon Pollack & Chuck Tatham	November 16, 2016	8ARG08	7.33
174	8	"The Alliance"	James Bagdonas	Andy Gordon & Ryan Walls	November 30, 2016	8ARG09	6.81
175	9	"Snow Ball"	Beth McCarthy-Miller	Christy Stratton & Stephen Lloyd	December 14, 2016	8ARG10	6.81
176	10	"Ringmaster Keifth"	Jim Hensz	Vali Chandrasekaran	January 4, 2017	8ARG11	7.57
177	11	"Sarge & Pea"	James Bagdonas	Abraham Higginbotham	January 11, 2017	8ARG07	7.59
178	12	"Do You Believe in Magic"	Gail Mancuso	Jon Pollack	February 8, 2017	8ARG15	7.34
179	13	"Do It Yourself"	Jeffrey Walker	Paul Corrigan & Brad Walsh	February 15, 2017	8ARG12	6.92
180	14	"Heavy is the Head"	Ken Whittingham	Danny Zuker	February 22, 2017	8ARG14	6.65
181	15	"Finding Fizbo"	James Bagdonas	Abraham Higginbotham & Chuck Tatham	March 1, 2017	8ARG16	6.41
182	16	"Basketball"	Jim Hensz	Elaine Ko	March 8, 2017	8ARG13	6.49
183	17	"Pig Moon Rising"	Chris Koch	Paul Corrigan & Brad Walsh	March 15, 2017	8ARG17	6.12
184	18	"Five Minutes"	Gail Mancuso	Elaine Ko	March 29, 2017	8ARG18	6.79
185	19	"Frank's Wedding"	Beth McCarthy-Miller	Andy Gordon	April 5, 2017	8ARG19	6.25
186	20	"All Things Being Equal"	Michelle MacLaren	Christy Stratton & Ryan Walls	May 3, 2017	8ARG20	5.65
187	21	"Alone Time"	Jim Hensz	Abraham Higginbotham & Stephen Lloyd & Danny Zuker	May 10, 2017	8ARG21	5.71
188	22	"The Graduates"	Steven Levitan	Jon Pollack & Jeffrey Richman & Chuck Tatham	May 17, 2017	8ARG22	6.20

=== Season 9 (2017–18) ===
No. overall	No. in season	Title	Directed by	Written by	Original release date	Prod. code	U.S. viewers (millions)
189	1	"Lake Life"	James Bagdonas	Elaine Ko	September 27, 2017	9ARG03	7.01
190	2	"The Long Goodbye"	Jim Hensz	Paul Corrigan & Brad Walsh	October 4, 2017	9ARG02	6.36
191	3	"Catch of the Day"	Fred Savage	Jeffrey Richman	October 11, 2017	9ARG01	6.27
192	4	"Sex, Lies and Kickball"	John Riggi	Abraham Higginbotham	October 18, 2017	9ARG05	6.22
193	5	"It's the Great Pumpkin, Phil Dunphy"	Beth McCarthy-Miller	Jon Pollack	October 25, 2017	9ARG04	5.96
194	6	"Ten Years Later"	Fred Savage	Danny Zuker	November 1, 2017	9ARG08	5.51
195	7	"Winner Winner Turkey Dinner"	Beth McCarthy-Miller	Bill Wrubel	November 15, 2017	9ARG06	5.96
196	8	"Brushes with Celebrity"	Jeffrey Walker	Vali Chandrasekaran	November 29, 2017	9ARG09	6.15
197	9	"Tough Love"	John Riggi	Stephen Lloyd	December 6, 2017	9ARG10	5.81
198	10	"No Small Feet"	James Bagdonas	Teleplay by : Ryan Walls; Story by : Ryan Walls & Matt Plonsker	December 13, 2017	9ARG07	5.89
199	11	"He Said, She Shed"	Jim Hensz	Jeffrey Richman & Ryan Walls	January 3, 2018	9ARG11	5.90
200	12	"Dear Beloved Family"	Gail Mancuso	Bill Wrubel	January 10, 2018	9ARG12	5.81
201	13	"In Your Head"	Steven Levitan	Jack Burditt	January 17, 2018	9ARG13	6.24
202	14	"Written in the Stars"	Jaffar Mahmood	Abraham Higginbotham & Jon Pollack	February 28, 2018	9ARG15	4.96
203	15	"Spanks for the Memories"	James Bagdonas	Paul Corrigan & Brad Walsh	March 7, 2018	9ARG14	5.25
204	16	"Wine Weekend"	Beth McCarthy-Miller	Elaine Ko	March 21, 2018	9ARG16	5.56
205	17	"Royal Visit"	Gail Mancuso	Teleplay by : Jack Burditt & Jessica Poter; Story by : Jeffrey Richman	March 28, 2018	9ARG17	5.43
206	18	"Daddy Issues"	Chris Koch	Vali Chandrasekaran & Stephen Lloyd	April 4, 2018	9ARG18	5.61
207	19	"CHiPs and Salsa"	Gail Mancuso	Paul Corrigan & Brad Walsh & Bill Wrubel	April 11, 2018	9ARG19	4.97
208	20	"Mother!"	Eric Dean Seaton	Teleplay by : Jon Pollack & Ryan Walls; Story by : Abraham Higginbotham	May 2, 2018	9ARG20	4.60
209	21	"The Escape"	Steven Levitan	Jack Burditt & Danny Zuker	May 9, 2018	9ARG21	4.73
210	22	"Clash of Swords"	Jim Hensz	Elaine Ko & Stephen Lloyd	May 16, 2018	9ARG22	5.02

=== Season 10 (2018–19) ===
Modern Family season 10 episodes
No. overall	No. in season	Title	Directed by	Written by	Original release date	Prod. code	U.S. viewers (millions)
211	1	"I Love a Parade"	James Bagdonas	Paul Corrigan & Brad Walsh	September 26, 2018	AARG01	5.40
212	2	"Kiss and Tell"	Steven Levitan	Abraham Higginbotham & Jon Pollack	October 3, 2018	AARG02	5.39
213	3	"A Sketchy Area"	Jeffrey Walker	Elaine Ko	October 10, 2018	AARG03	5.10
214	4	"Torn Between Two Lovers"	Beth McCarthy-Miller	Jeffrey Richman & Danny Zuker	October 17, 2018	AARG04	5.03
215	5	"Good Grief"	Beth McCarthy-Miller	Vali Chandrasekaran & Stephen Lloyd	October 24, 2018	AARG06	5.27
216	6	"On the Same Paige"	Ryan Case	Ryan Walls	October 31, 2018	AARG05	5.01
217	7	"Did the Chicken Cross the Road?"	Eric Dean Seaton	Bill Wrubel	November 7, 2018	AARG07	5.44
218	8	"Kids These Days"	James Bagdonas	Jon Pollack & Danny Zuker	November 28, 2018	AARG08	4.85
219	9	"Putting Down Roots"	Kat Coiro	Jack Burditt	December 5, 2018	AARG10	4.87
220	10	"Stuck in a Moment"	Fred Savage	Elaine Ko	December 12, 2018	AARG09	5.69
221	11	"A Moving Day"	Iwona Sapienza	Paul Corrigan & Brad Walsh	January 9, 2019	AARG12	4.82
222	12	"Blasts from the Past"	Fred Savage	Vali Chandrasekaran & Stephen Lloyd	January 16, 2019	AARG11	4.62
223	13	"Whanex?"	Elaine Ko	Bill Wrubel	January 23, 2019	AARG13	4.50
224	14	"We Need to Talk About Lily"	Abraham Higginbotham	Abraham Higginbotham & Jeffrey Richman	January 30, 2019	AARG14	4.92
225	15	"SuperShowerBabyBowl"	Helena Lamb-Weber	Jack Burditt & Jon Pollack	February 20, 2019	AARG15	4.43
226	16	"Red Alert"	Julie Bowen	Teleplay by : Jessica Poter & Ryan Walls; Story by : Ryan Walls	February 27, 2019	AARG16	4.33
227	17	"The Wild"	James Bagdonas	Elaine Ko	March 13, 2019	AARG17	4.65
228	18	"Stand by Your Man"	Jim Hensz	Teleplay by : Jack Burditt & Bill Wrubel; Story by : Jeffrey Richman	March 20, 2019	AARG20	4.25
229	19	"Yes-Woman"	Fred Savage	Paul Corrigan & Brad Walsh	April 3, 2019	AARG19	4.33
230	20	"Can't Elope"	Jeffrey Walker	Danny Zuker	April 10, 2019	AARG18	4.81
231	21	"Commencement"	Eric Dean Seaton	Vali Chandrasekaran & Stephen Lloyd	May 1, 2019	AARG21	4.24
232	22	"A Year of Birthdays"	Steven Levitan	Steven Levitan	May 8, 2019	AARG22	4.41

=== Season 11 (2019–20) ===
Modern Family season 11 episodes
No. overall	No. in season	Title	Directed by	Written by	Original release date	Prod. code	U.S. viewers (millions)
233	1	"New Kids on the Block"	Gail Mancuso	Paul Corrigan & Brad Walsh	September 25, 2019	BARG01	4.09
234	2	"Snapped"	Michael Spiller	Elaine Ko	October 2, 2019	BARG02	4.32
235	3	"Perfect Pairs"	Iwona Sapienza	Stephen Lloyd	October 9, 2019	BARG04	3.95
236	4	"Pool Party"	Abraham Higginbotham	Abraham Higginbotham & Jon Pollack	October 16, 2019	BARG03	4.21
237	5	"The Last Halloween"	Fred Savage	Danny Zuker	October 30, 2019	BARG06	3.93
238	6	"A Game of Chicken"	Helena Lamb-Weber	Vali Chandrasekaran	November 6, 2019	BARG05	3.95
239	7	"The Last Thanksgiving"	Eric Dean Seaton	Jeffrey Richman	November 20, 2019	BARG10	3.95
240	8	"Tree's a Crowd"	Julie Bowen	Ryan Walls	December 4, 2019	BARG07	3.82
241	9	"The Last Christmas"	Jeff Walker	Abraham Higginbotham & Jon Pollack	December 11, 2019	BARG09	4.27
242	10	"The Prescott"	Elaine Ko	Elaine Ko	January 8, 2020	BARG08	6.39
243	11	"Legacy"	Jason Z. Kemp	Jack Burditt & Christopher Lloyd	January 15, 2020	BARG12	3.84
244	12	"Dead on a Rival"	Jason Winer	Jeffrey Richman & Ryan Walls	January 22, 2020	BARG13	3.50
245	13	"Paris"	James Bagdonas	Paul Corrigan & Brad Walsh	February 12, 2020	BARG11	3.73
246	14	"Spuds"	Beth McCarthy-Miller	Vali Chandrasekaran & Stephen Lloyd	February 19, 2020	BARG14	3.28
247	15	"Baby Steps"	Trey Clinesmith	Story by : Abraham Higginbotham & Jon Pollack; Teleplay by : Steven Levitan & Morgan Murphy	March 18, 2020	BARG15	4.33
248	16	"I'm Going to Miss This"	Fred Savage	Jack Burditt & Danny Zuker	April 1, 2020	BARG16	4.33
249	17	"Finale"	Steven Levitan	Steven Levitan & Abraham Higginbotham & Jeffrey Richman & Stephen Lloyd & Jon Pollack & Morgan Murphy & Ryan Walls	April 8, 2020	BARG17	7.37
250	18	"Finale"	Gail Mancuso	Christopher Lloyd & Paul Corrigan & Brad Walsh & Danny Zuker & Elaine Ko & Vali Chandrasekaran & Jack Burditt	April 8, 2020	BARG18	7.37

=== Special (2020) ===
Modern Family special episodes
Title	Directed by	Original release date	U.S. viewers (millions)
"A Modern Farewell"	Chris Wilcha	April 8, 2020	6.64

== Ratings ==
Modern Family : U.S. viewers per episode (millions)

Season	Episode number																								Average
Season	1	2	3	4	5	6	7	8	9	10	11	12	13	14	15	16	17	18	19	20	21	22	23	24	Average
1	12.61	9.99	8.82	9.35	8.66	9.33	8.77	9.16	7.15	9.67	10.22	7.83	9.83	9.19	9.84	8.01	9.02	9.18	9.51	8.88	10.01	9.48	10.34	10.14	9.49
2	12.67	11.92	11.44	11.45	11.97	13.14	12.24	12.09	10.57	11.08	11.83	11.12	10.94	13.16	10.57	10.17	10.11	10.90	9.61	9.95	9.90	10.15	10.30	10.31	11.89
3	14.52	14.54	13.45	13.24	13.65	13.04	13.37	12.91	12.72	12.20	14.03	12.12	11.89	12.90	11.23	11.54	11.63	10.60	10.35	10.21	10.06	10.58	9.36	10.07	12.93
4	14.44	12.08	12.31	12.28	12.52	10.62	12.43	11.89	12.01	10.94	12.04	11.01	10.83	9.83	10.05	10.62	10.53	9.09	10.88	10.38	9.64	9.02	10.03	10.01	12.31
5	11.71	11.65	11.12	10.64	10.94	10.32	10.75	10.19	9.47	10.61	9.51	9.14	9.59	9.87	8.52	9.22	9.39	10.09	9.00	9.59	8.39	8.55	9.08	10.45	11.79
6	11.38	10.56	10.30	9.71	10.16	9.92	9.83	10.88	9.02	9.69	9.29	9.44	9.87	9.77	8.80	9.32	9.61	8.71	9.43	8.85	8.00	8.57	8.13	7.20	11.91
7	9.46	8.72	7.99	7.88	7.80	8.15	8.38	7.35	8.20	8.35	8.17	7.80	7.48	8.10	8.22	8.14	7.69	7.51	7.44	7.42	7.16	6.79	–		9.83
8	8.24	7.41	6.97	7.50	7.38	7.23	7.33	6.81	6.81	7.57	7.59	7.34	6.92	6.65	6.41	6.49	6.12	6.79	6.25	5.65	5.71	6.20	–		8.79
9	7.01	6.36	6.27	6.22	5.96	5.51	5.96	6.15	5.81	5.89	5.90	5.81	6.24	4.96	5.25	5.56	5.43	5.61	4.97	4.60	4.73	5.02	–		7.09
10	5.40	5.39	5.10	5.03	5.27	5.01	5.44	4.85	4.87	5.69	4.82	4.62	4.50	4.92	4.43	4.33	4.65	4.25	4.33	4.81	4.24	4.41	–		6.40
11	4.09	4.32	3.95	4.21	3.93	3.95	3.95	3.82	4.27	6.39	3.84	3.50	3.73	3.28	4.33	4.33	7.37	7.37	–						7.10

Audience measurement performed by Nielsen Media Research
