= Modern Family season 5 =

Modern Family
- Season 5
- DVD cover
- Starring: Ed O'Neill; Sofía Vergara; Julie Bowen; Ty Burrell; Jesse Tyler Ferguson; Eric Stonestreet; Sarah Hyland; Ariel Winter; Nolan Gould; Rico Rodriguez; Aubrey Anderson-Emmons
- No. of episodes: 24

Release
- Original network: ABC
- Original release: September 25, 2013 – May 21, 2014

Season chronology
- ← Previous; Season 4 Next → Season 6

The fifth season of the American television sitcom Modern Family aired on ABC from September 25, 2013 to May 21, 2014.

This season was ordered on May 10, 2013. The season was produced by Lloyd-Levitan Productions in association with 20th Century Fox Television, with series creators Steven Levitan and Christopher Lloyd serving as showrunners.

== Cast ==
=== Main cast ===
- Ed O'Neill as Jay Pritchett
- Sofía Vergara as Gloria Pritchett
- Julie Bowen as Claire Dunphy
- Ty Burrell as Phil Dunphy
- Jesse Tyler Ferguson as Mitchell Pritchett
- Eric Stonestreet as Cameron Tucker
- Sarah Hyland as Haley Dunphy
- Ariel Winter as Alex Dunphy
- Nolan Gould as Luke Dunphy
- Rico Rodriguez as Manny Delgado
- Aubrey Anderson-Emmons as Lily Tucker-Pritchett

=== Recurring cast ===
- Adam DeVine as Andy Bailey
- Nathan Lane as Pepper Saltzman
- Christian Barillas as Ronaldo
- Reid Ewing as Dylan Marshall
- Dana Powell as Pam Tucker
- Celia Weston as Barb Tucker

=== Guest cast ===
- Justin Kirk as Charlie Bingham
- Andrew Daly as Principal Brown
- Diane Farr as Diane
- Spenser McNeil as Reuben
- Fred Willard as Frank Dunphy
- Jordan Peele as Derrick
- Ann Guilbert as Cameron's grandmother
- Elizabeth Peña as Pilar Ramirez
- John Benjamin Hickey as Dr. Clark
- Jane Krakowski as Dr. Donna Duncan
- Jesse Eisenberg as Asher
- Chazz Palminteri as Shorty
- Rob Riggle as Gil Thorpe
- John Heard as Gunther Thorpe
- Aisha Tyler as Wendy
- Will Sasso as Señor Kaplan
- Alyson Reed as Angela
- Marc Evan Jackson as Tad
- Patton Oswalt as Ducky
- Fred Armisen as Langham
- Stephen Merchant as Leslie Higgins
- Rhys Darby as Fergus Anderson
- Elizabeth Banks as Sal
- Barry Corbin as Merle Tucker
- Kevin Daniels as Longines
- Colin Hanlon as Steven

== Production ==
The first episode of the season, "Suddenly, Last Summer", which premiered on ABC on September 25, 2013, made reference to the newly legalized same-sex marriage in California. The writers said that a wedding for Mitch and Cam was a "real possibility". In January 2014, it was announced that Modern Family's vacation episode would take place in Australia this season. The season was produced by Steven Levitan Productions and Picador Productions in association with 20th Century Fox Television, with creators Steven Levitan and Christopher Lloyd as showrunners.

== Episodes ==
No. overall	No. in season	Title	Directed by	Written by	Original release date	Prod. code	U.S. viewers (millions)
97	1	"Suddenly, Last Summer"	James Bagdonas	Jeffrey Richman	September 25, 2013	5ARG01	11.71
After the legalization of gay marriage in California, Mitch and Cam plan their perfect proposals, not realizing that the other has something planned. Cam calls for the help of Jay and Gloria and Mitch rallies Claire and Phil to help make their evening perfect. Phil and Claire try to get a kid-free week for themselves during the holidays by strategizing an overlap of the kids’ summer activities.
98	2	"First Days"	Steven Levitan	Paul Corrigan & Brad Walsh	September 25, 2013	5ARG02	11.65
It's Manny and Luke's first day at high school and both Phil and Gloria don't want to let their sons go. Confiding in each other, Phil and Gloria end up as extras in a commercial. Elsewhere, Claire joins Jay's company and Cam subs as Alex's history teacher, who both have issues in their new positions. Claire tries to win the employees’ friendship, and pushes Jay away.
99	3	"Larry's Wife"	Jeffrey Walker	Bill Wrubel	October 2, 2013	5ARG05	11.12
Cam and Mitch start planning their wedding; Lily is worried about her cat, Larry, who hasn't come home for days; Phil has a new target group of clients in the form of newly divorced women; and Gloria is worried about little Joe being evil after some things he did. Jay and Manny argue over Jay’s temperamental behaviour.
100	4	"Farm Strong"	Alisa Statman	Elaine Ko	October 9, 2013	5ARG04	10.64
Cam's sister Pam (guest star by Dana Powell) comes for a visit and Cam and Mitch struggle on how to tell her they are getting married while she holds the secret of her own engagement to Cam’s former crush; Claire convinces Phil to skip Luke's soccer game while Gloria refuses to admit that she needs reading glasses. Claire ends up going to the soccer game and Luke gives his best performance so far, which makes her feel guilty about making Phil not attend.
101	5	"The Late Show"	Beth McCarthy-Miller	Abraham Higginbotham	October 16, 2013	5ARG06	10.94
Jay has made reservations for the whole family at a new restaurant that he has waited to go to for months. However, everyone seems to be running late: Gloria takes forever to get ready, Claire becomes paranoid about letting Luke stay home alone and Cam and Mitch fight after they both wear the same outfit. Elsewhere, Alex babysits Lily; and Haley spends the night with Manny and Joe.
102	6	"The Help"	Jim Hensz	Danny Zuker	October 23, 2013	5ARG07	10.32
Gloria tries to find a new nanny for little Joe and ends up hiring a male nanny — something that Jay and Manny don't like; Phil's dad, Frank, stays with the Dunphys for a while after his break-up; Cam and Mitch ask their friend Pepper to plan their wedding.
103	7	"A Fair to Remember"	Beth McCarthy-Miller	Emily Spivey	November 13, 2013	5ARG09	10.75
The family (save Haley) heads to the school fair where everyone finds something to do. Haley stays back home to enjoy Jay and Gloria's pool and the sun but is interrupted by the presence of Andy.
104	8	"ClosetCon '13"	Fred Savage	Ben Karlin	November 20, 2013	5ARG08	10.19
Claire and Jay attend a Closet Convention where Claire’s misconception of Jay having an affair ends up in her learning a past secret; Phil discovers what Jay is hiding in his secret closet; Mitch and Cam visit Cam's hometown. Alex and Haley fight over the local pizza delivery boy but soon become tangled in an even much bigger mess.
105	9	"The Big Game"	Beth McCarthy-Miller	Megan Ganz	December 4, 2013	5ARG03	9.47
Cam gets ready to coach an important football game that could break a record, but his intensity blocks out the fact that the other team is at a disadvantage. Mitchell tries to quit his job, Phil desperately tries to sell a house, and Claire doesn't want her father's help at work. Haley tries to fix the fact that Alex is ignored amongst her fellow students.
106	10	"The Old Man & the Tree"	Bryan Cranston	Paul Corrigan & Brad Walsh	December 11, 2013	5ARG10	10.61
Jay takes Manny out to cut down their own Christmas tree, and Gloria is on edge with her mom in town, but changes her tune when she sees her bonding with Claire. Elsewhere, Mitchell is forced to do last minute shopping when they didn't get Lily the right gift, and Cameron takes Lily to a charity event where they experience the true meaning of Christmas.
107	11	"And One to Grow On"	Gail Mancuso	Jeffrey Richman	January 8, 2014	5ARG12	9.51
Phil tricks Luke into taking a dance class, but the joke's on him when the white lie indirectly lands him in the slammer. Meanwhile, Jay and Gloria are throwing birthday parties for both Manny and Joe and are concerned Manny might be going for girls out of his league; Mitch and Cam get a rude awakening in the cutthroat world of booking a wedding venue. Haley takes Alex for a driving lesson.
108	12	"Under Pressure"	James Bagdonas	Elaine Ko	January 15, 2014	5ARG11	9.14
Claire suffers from pressure during Alex’s high school open house, while Jay teaches Phil how to play hooky. Gloria butts heads with a fellow mom (Jane Krakowski), Luke and Manny date twins, Mitch meets his new environmentally-conscious neighbor (Jesse Eisenberg) and Alex goes to see a therapist on her birthday after a mental breakdown.
109	13	"Three Dinners"	Steven Levitan	Abraham Higginbotham, Steven Levitan & Jeffrey Richman	January 22, 2014	5ARG15	9.59
Phil and Claire take Haley out to dinner to discuss her future, but she manages to turn the tables. Jay's friend Shorty and wife Darlene are back visiting, and they have some news that does not sit well with Jay. Mitch and Cam decide to have a nice romantic dinner date, where they don’t talk about the wedding or about Lily, leading to a lot of awkward silence; they end up making friends with the people on the table next to theirs.
110	14	"iSpy"	Gail Mancuso	Abraham Higginbotham	February 5, 2014	5ARG13	9.87
Claire and Phil try to spy on Luke to see where he is going as they suspect that he’s smoking pot, while they ask Alex to spy on Haley, where they learn about the photograph exhibition Haley is taking part in. Mitch tries to hide a piece of gossip from Cam with little success and Gloria thinks that Jay was dreaming about another woman in his sleep.
111	15	"The Feud"	Ryan Case	Story by : Christopher Lloyd; Teleplay by : Dan O'Shannon	February 26, 2014	5ARG14	8.52
Jay, Phil, and Luke find out unfavourable men in each of their lives are more connected than previously thought as they arrive at Luke's wrestling match. Claire catches lice from Lily after Mitch and Cam fail to warn her in order to get Lily picked up from school as a favour. Haley and Alex battle with a possum. Manny is ashamed of Gloria's presence at a museum class trip.
112	16	"Spring-a-Ding-Fling"	Gail Mancuso	Ben Karlin	March 5, 2014	5ARG16	9.22
Much to her chagrin, Haley has to accompany Phil at a realtor's banquet. Cam feels excluded when a popular Spanish teacher returns and has to call Claire for help. Luke and Alex have dates. Mitch misinterprets his new boss's signs. Gloria and Jay babysit Lily.
113	17	"Other People's Children"	Jim Hensz	Megan Ganz	March 12, 2014	5ARG17	9.39
Jay decides to initiate Luke into woodworking. Meanwhile, Claire and Gloria help Lily choose a flower girl dress for her fathers' wedding. Cam, Mitch, Alex, and Manny take a cultural day at the museum. Phil decides to help Andy create an elaborate video to celebrate his anniversary with his girlfriend.
114	18	"Las Vegas"	Gail Mancuso	Paul Corrigan & Brad Walsh & Bill Wrubel	March 26, 2014	5ARG18	10.09
The adults take a trip to Vegas in which Jay tries to obtain the best room. Claire rekindles her gambling addiction while Cam attends Mitch's ex's bachelor party. Gloria tries to hide a female version of the dog Butler. Phil presents his case to enter a secret yet prestigious magic society. Patton Oswalt, Stephen Merchant, and Fred Armisen guest star.
115	19	"A Hard Jay's Night"	Beth McCarthy-Miller	Megan Ganz & Ben Karlin	April 2, 2014	5ARG20	9.00
Mitch struggles to hide his genuine feelings about an unflattering wedding topper Cam's father made; Phil tries to help Gloria sell the apartment she had before Jay but they get sidetracked at a salon; Jay wants to host a nice family evening.
116	20	"Australia"	Steven Levitan	Elaine Ko & Danny Zuker	April 23, 2014	5ARG21	9.59
The family travels to Australia as Phil tries to fulfill his mother's wish for him to visit the country where he was conceived. Unfortunately, Phil's attempts to embrace his native land are met by a lot of rejection, while Jay and Claire let work eat into vacation time, and Mitch and Cam get reacquainted with an old friend (Rhys Darby).
117	21	"Sleeper"	Ryan Case	Paul Corrigan, Brad Walsh & Bill Wrubel	April 30, 2014	5ARG22	8.39
Phil fails at his one task to stay home and wait for the repairman, forcing him to tell an elaborate lie to hide the truth from Claire, but the stress is more than he can physically handle. Meanwhile, Gloria is obsessing over the family portrait she is responsible for organizing this year. Claire accuses Cam of being too snobby to use her girls' hand-me-downs, and Jay secretly enters Stella in a dog show.
118	22	"Message Received"	Jeffrey Walker	Steven Levitan	May 7, 2014	5ARG19	8.55
Jay, Gloria and Manny challenge each other to step through their comfort zone. Mitch and Cam's wedding is getting too big and costly so they resort to selling a couple of their prized possessions, and the kids play a joke on Phil and Claire.
119	23	"The Wedding"	Steven Levitan	Abraham Higginbotham, Ben Karlin & Jeffrey Richman	May 14, 2014	5ARG23	9.08
120	24	"The Wedding"	Alisa Statman	Megan Ganz, Christopher Lloyd & Dan O'Shannon	May 14, 2014	5ARG24	10.45
Cam and Mitchell's wedding arrives, but their big day gets questioned when things go wrong. Gloria and Jay give relationship advice's to Cam's parents, and things take a turn for the unexpected. Phil and Claire get to know the kids better and Haley puts herself in the middle of a relationship breakup. When Cam and Mitchell's wedding day goes awry, the plans fall to Pepper as he finds a nice place to relocate the wedding and everyone there. Jay and Gloria convince Cam's parents not to split up.

== Reception ==
=== Reviews ===
The fifth season of Modern Family received positive reviews from television critics. While episodes like "Larry's Wife", "Australia" and "Sleeper" were negatively received, others like "The Old Man & the Tree," "Las Vegas," and "Message Received" premiered to high acclaim, with the latter two frequently cited among the show's best episodes.

Reviewing the season's first eight episodes, Matthew Wolfson of Slant Magazine wrote that the show "appear[ed] to have finally arrived at the depressing and predictable low point toward which it [had] been trending for the past two years." He also went on to say that the show had "turned into a shrill pastiche of stereotypical characterizations and superficial banter lacking both feeling and wit", assigning it a rating of 1.5/4 stars. Different writers for The A.V. Club rated, in total, a majority of the former-half episodes with a "B−" grade or less. One writer for the magazine, Joshua Alston, gave "ClosetCon '13" a "C+" and remarked that "Modern Family becomes a high-wire act when it separates its characters into three storylines with no overlap between them." The second half was more warmly received, with three episodes rated an "A−" or higher.

Despite the somewhat mixed reception for the season, Aubrey Anderson-Emmons's performance as Lily received positive reviews. In his review of "The Help", Joe Reid, writing for The A.V. Club, called Lily a "veritable one-liner machine". Reviewing the same episode, Leigh Raines of TV Fanatic said that the funniest part of the half-hour was "Lily at the end rolling her eyes and banging her head on the table listening to Cam, Mitchell and Pepper arguing over wedding plans".

== Ratings ==
Viewership and ratings per episode of Modern Family season 5
No.	Title	Air date	Rating/share (18–49)	Viewers (millions)	DVR (18–49)	DVR viewers (millions)	Total (18–49)	Total viewers (millions)
1	"Suddenly, Last Summer"	September 25, 2013	4.3/12 (8)	11.71 (15)	2.2	4.55	6.5	16.26
2	"First Days"	September 25, 2013	4.1/12 (8)	11.65 (15)	2.1	4.28	6.2	15.94
3	"Larry's Wife"	October 2, 2013	4.2/12 (7)	11.12 (16)	2.0	4.09	6.2	15.21
4	"Farm Strong"	October 9, 2013	3.9/11 (6)	10.64 (13)	1.8	3.95	5.7	14.60
5	"The Late Show"	October 16, 2013	4.1/11 (5)	10.94 (14)	1.8	3.94	5.9	14.88
6	"The Help"	October 23, 2013	3.9/10 (8)	10.32 (20)	1.7	3.90	5.6	14.22
7	"A Fair to Remember"	November 13, 2013	3.8/11 (6)	10.75 (15)	2.0	4.28	5.8	15.03
8	"ClosetCon '13"	November 20, 2013	3.4/9 (7)	10.19 (19)	2.1	4.64	5.5	14.83
9	"The Big Game"	December 4, 2013	3.2/9 (10)	9.47 (16)	2.2	4.67	5.4	14.14
10	"The Old Man & the Tree"	December 11, 2013	3.5/10 (6)	10.61 (12)	1.9	4.02	5.4	14.63
11	"And One to Grow On"	January 8, 2014	3.5/10 (5)	9.51 (17)	2.1	4.48	5.6	14.02
12	"Under Pressure"	January 15, 2014	3.2/9 (6)	9.14 (16)	2.1	4.46	5.3	13.91
13	"Three Dinners"	January 22, 2014	3.4/9 (5)	9.59 (12)	2.3	5.04	5.7	14.66
14	"iSpy"	February 5, 2014	3.5/9 (8)	9.87 (18)	2.1	4.45	5.6	14.32
15	"The Feud"	February 26, 2014	3.1/9 (12)	8.52	2.4	4.87	5.5	13.39
16	"Spring-a-Ding-Fling"	March 5, 2014	3.4/10 (5)	9.22 (20)	2.1	4.74	5.5	13.98
17	"Other People's Children"	March 12, 2014	3.4/10 (5)	9.39 (19)	1.9	4.32	5.4	13.74
18	"Las Vegas"	March 26, 2014	3.6/11 (2)	10.09 (10)	2.3	5.03	5.9	15.12
19	"A Hard Jay's Night"	April 2, 2014	3.3/9 (5)	9.00 (20)	2.2	4.73	5.5	13.73
20	"Australia"	April 23, 2014	3.5/10 (2)	9.59 (12)	2.0	4.43	5.5	14.02
21	"Sleeper"	April 30, 2014	2.8/8 (3)	8.39 (22)	2.0	4.23	4.8	12.62
22	"Message Received"	May 7, 2014	2.9/8 (3)	8.55 (18)	2.0	4.36	4.9	12.92
23	"The Wedding (Part 1)"	May 14, 2014	3.2/10 (3)	9.08 (18)	2.0	4.77	5.2	13.84
24	"The Wedding (Part 2)"	May 21, 2014	3.7/11 (1)	10.45 (7)	2.3	5.45	6.0	15.90

== Awards and nominations ==
=== Primetime Emmy Awards ===
The fifth season received ten nominations at the 66th Primetime Emmy Awards in total, including its fifth consecutive nomination for Outstanding Comedy Series. The ceremony for the Primetime Awards aired on August 25, 2013 on NBC while the Primetime Creative Arts Awards took place on August 16, 2013.

Primetime Awards
Year	Category	Nominees	For role/episode	Outcome
2014	Outstanding Comedy Series	Modern Family		Won
2014	Outstanding Supporting Actor in Comedy Series	Ty Burrell	Role: Phil Dunphy; Episode: "Spring-a-Ding-Fling"	Won
2014	Outstanding Supporting Actor in Comedy Series	Jesse Tyler Ferguson	Role: Mitchell Pritchett; Episode: "Message Received"	Nominated
2014	Outstanding Supporting Actress in Comedy Series	Julie Bowen	Role: Claire Dunphy; Episode: "The Feud"	Nominated
2014	Outstanding Directing for a Comedy Series	Gail Mancuso	Episode: "Las Vegas"	Won
Primetime Creative Arts Awards
Year	Category	Nominees	For role/episode	Outcome
2014	Outstanding Casting for a Comedy Series	Jeff Greenberg		Nominated
2014	Outstanding Guest Actor in a Comedy Series	Nathan Lane	Role: Pepper Saltzman; Episode: "The Wedding (Part 2)"	Nominated
2014	Outstanding Art Direction for a Contemporary Program		Episode: "Las Vegas"	Nominated
2014	Outstanding Single-Camera Picture; Editing for a Comedy Series	Ryan Case	Episode: "Las Vegas"	Nominated
2014	Outstanding Sound Mixing for a Comedy or Drama Series (Half-Hour) and Animation	Stephen A. Tibbo, Dean Okrand, and Brian R. Harman	Episode: "The Wedding (Part 1)"	Nominated

== Home Media release ==
The Fifth season of Modern Family was released on DVD in a three-disc set on September 23, 2014. The box-set contains all 24 episodes, deleted and alternate Scenes, an extended episode, a blooper reel and more. Starting from this season on, 20th Century Home Entertainment decided to ditch the Blu-ray format and instead, they only released the subsequent seasons of the show on DVD and Digital HD.

Modern Family: The Complete Fifth Season
Set Details		Special Features
24 episodes (1 Extended); 3-disc set; 1.78:1 aspect ratio; English (Dolby Digital 5.1); Subtitles: English, French, Spanish and Portuguese; Runtime: 517 minutes		Extended Episode - "The Big Game"; Deleted and Alternate Scenes; A Modern Family Vacation: Behind-the-Scenes in Australia; A Day on Set with Jesse; Shooting on Location in Las Vegas; Mitch & Cam's Wedding: A Behind-the-Scenes Look at How It All Came Together; Gag Reel
Release Dates
Region 1	Region 2	Region 4
September 23, 2014	September 15, 2014	October 7, 2014
