= The Wedding (Modern Family) =

- Modern Family episodes
- Episode nos.: Season 5 Episodes 23/24
- Directed by: Steven Levitan (Part 1); Alisa Statman (Part 2)
- Written by: Abraham Higginbotham; Ben Karlin; Jeffrey Richman (Part 1); Megan Ganz; Christopher Lloyd; Dan O'Shannon (Part 2)
- Production code: 5ARG23/5ARG24
- Original air dates: May 14, 2014 (Part 1); May 21, 2014 (Part 2)

Guest appearances
- Nathan Lane as Pepper Saltzman; Elizabeth Banks as Sal; Barry Corbin as Merle Tucker; Celia Weston as Barbara Tucker; Adam DeVine as Andy; Christian Barillas as Ronaldo; Dana Powell as Pameron Tucker; Kevin Daniels as Longinus; Colin Hanlon as Steven; Matt Riedy as Howard; Tony Pasqualini as Larry (Part 1); Steve Hytner as Sales Clerk (Part 1); Michael Benyaer as Jerry (Part 1); Jeremiah Birkett as Fire Marshal

Episode chronology
← Previous "Message Received"	Next → "The Long Honeymoon"
- Modern Family season 5

"The Wedding" is the finale of the fifth season of the American sitcom Modern Family. It aired in two parts, on May 14, 2014, and May 21, 2014. The first part was written by Abraham Higginbotham, Ben Karlin and Jeffrey Richman, and directed by Steven Levitan. The second part was written by Megan Ganz, Christopher Lloyd, and Dan O'Shannon and directed by Alisa Statman. Both episodes received mixed reviews from critics, however the various guest performances (particularly Nathan Lane as Pepper Saltzman) were highly praised. This episode was filmed at the Trump National Golf Club, Los Angeles.

== Plot ==
=== Part 1 ===
Mitch (Jesse Tyler Ferguson) and Cam (Eric Stonestreet) wake up on their wedding day only to find their wedding organizers, Pepper (Nathan Lane) and Ronaldo (Christian Barillas) giving them their "full packages" by bringing them breakfast in bed. Mitch talks to Claire (Julie Bowen), who informs him that their mother will not be attending the wedding because of a hip injury she sustained during a yoga retreat.

Later on, while getting ready, Cam finds out that the dry-cleaners gave him the wrong tuxedo and tells Mitch that they need to go to the dry-cleaners to pick up a new one. When they get there, the dry-cleaners is closed and Cameron starts panicking especially after Pepper calls to say that there is a wildfire near the wedding's venue and the wedding will be moved four hours earlier. Mitchell quickly finds a solution that involves Lily (Aubrey Anderson-Emmons) going into the dry-cleaners through an express box. Lily soon gets in trouble and the owner of the dry-cleaners, Jerry (Michael Benyaer), arrives because the shop's alarm was triggered. Jerry opens the store and hands Cameron the appropriate tuxedo while Mitchell manages to rescue Lily. Mitch and Cam arrive at the wedding on time, but the wedding is stopped by firefighters who inform everyone that they have to evacuate the venue immediately.

Meanwhile, Claire and Phil (Ty Burrell) decide to get to know the kids better by having Claire picking up Luke (Nolan Gould) and having Alex (Ariel Winter) drive her dad to the eye doctor and then to the mall to get the wedding present. Claire discovers that she has been distant with Luke and does not know what is going on with him so she decides to take him boating, but they soon get stuck in the middle of the lake.

Alex and Phil arrive at the mall after Phil's appointment with the eye doctor, which temporarily reduces his sight, leaving him barely able to see. Despite needing to get the wedding present, Phil is constantly distracted by items in other shops and wants to have fun. When they finally get to the shop that sells the wedding present, the line is already too long and Phil decides to pretend to be blind so he can get the present faster. When he gets to the front of the line, the salesman gives Phil the present Claire had ordered but in the wrong color, and later confronts Phil when he suspects that he is not actually blind. Alex intervenes, telling the salesman that her father lost his sight in a humanitarian mission and berating him for taking advantage of Phil's blindness. The salesman apologizes and goes to find the correct present.

Cameron's parents, Merle (Barry Corbin) and Barb (Celia Weston), stay at Jay's (Ed O'Neill) house for the wedding and have really quiet 'arguments' from time to time. Barb soon starts to talk to Gloria (Sofía Vergara) about it and Gloria encourages her to take action to fix their relationship by telling Merle what bothers her. At the same time, Merle and Jay go for a day spa to relax before the wedding and Merle talks to Jay about the same thing. Just as Gloria did with Barb, Jay advises Merle to fix the relationship. After Merle and Jay meet with Gloria and Barb at the wedding, Barb and Merle have another argument and decide to end their marriage.

Andy (Adam DeVine) has to catch a flight to Utah to meet his girlfriend, but he is panicking because his taxi for the airport has not arrived and he needs someone to drive him. Gloria asks Haley (Sarah Hyland) to help and, despite saying that she does not want to do it, she agrees. On their way to the airport, Andy receives a text from the airline company that informs him that the flight is delayed for three hours. Having nothing to do, Andy and Haley go out for a coffee where Haley tells him that while reading the airline company text message, she also saw a text from his girlfriend telling him to not go to Utah because their relationship is over. Andy says that Beth always does that but she does not mean it, and that everything will be fine once he gets there.

=== Part 2 ===
It is Mitch and Cam's big day, but their wedding is interrupted by the firefighters who ask them to evacuate the area immediately because of an approaching wildfire. Pepper manages to convince the firefighters to give them half an hour so they can finish the wedding, but just as Mitch and Cam are about to get married, Sal goes into labor, and she needs to get to the hospital, leaving Cam and Mitch with nobody to marry them. Phil volunteers to do it, but the firefighters return, demanding that everyone immediately evacuate because the wildfire's approach has accelerated.

Pepper finds another wedding venue available, but the wedding is interrupted again by the couple who had originally booked the venue for the day. The wedding is moved, this time to Mitch and Cam's apartment, but the apartment gets too crowded, and half the guests have to stand outside on the lawn. Remembering an earlier comment from Jay that all of these problems may be signs from God that they should not get married, Cam wonders if the entire "mess" is indeed a sign and that the wedding should not happen. Left with no other choice, Cam and Mitch decide to cancel the wedding. When Mitch starts announcing the guests to inform them of the wedding's cancellation, he gets interrupted by Jay, who tells him that they can not have their big wedding day in their apartment. Mitch expects this to be another indication that Jay has mixed feelings about the wedding, but instead Jay reveals that he has booked his country club as the perfect wedding venue and is proud that his son is marrying Cam. Jay and Gloria walk Mitch down the aisle, followed by Barb and Merle with Cam. They get married. As a voiceover during the ceremony, we hear Claire's 'best person' speech at the reception, thanking the man who will protect and love her brother just as much as she does.

Meanwhile, Jay and Gloria feel responsible for the impending dissolution of Merle and Barb's marriage and are determined to fix it. While traveling between wedding venues on a school bus, Jay talks to Barb about Merle and discovers that Barb found a flask of liquor in his coat (which he has previously loaned her), and is now drunk. Gloria talks to Merle about Barb as well, telling him a story about how lonely he will feel if he ends the marriage with his beloved. Later, Merle and Barb have another argument but when they walk their son down the aisle, they both seem happy once more.

Alex observes that Haley's actions show that she has a crush on Andy, but Haley refuses to admit it. However, when they arrive at the venue that is close to the cafe where Andy is waiting for his flight, Haley goes to find him and to talk to him about his girlfriend. She tells him that he is able to get a better girlfriend than Beth, who does not deserve him, using examples of her own previous treatment of boys to show him how Beth is not treating him well. Haley quickly leaves as she gets a call from her mother, but she later receives a call from Andy who asks if she was referring to someone in particular earlier. Haley refuses to admit that by "someone better" she meant herself, so Andy, who took a cab and came to the wedding to find her, does not say he is there, and he leaves.

Luke and Manny wonder if it is difficult to officiate a marriage, so they ask Phil who says that it's not, and he demonstrates what he is required to say. While doing so, Luke and Manny inadvertently appear to be a bridal couple, saying the marriage vows and unknowingly standing in front of a wedding arch, something that Alex records on her phone. Throughout the rest of the day, Luke and Manny constantly argue, which Alex finds amusing since they appear to be acting like a married couple. This continues until after Cam and Mitch have left for their honeymoon.

== Ratings ==
In its original American broadcast, "The Wedding (Part 1)" was watched by 9.08 million; up by 0.53 from the previous episode. "The Wedding (Part 2)" was watched by 10.45 million; up by 1.37 from the previous episode. The episode was the show's most viewed episode finale out of all five seasons.

== Critical reception ==
=== Part 1 ===
"The Wedding (Part 1)" received mixed reviews.

Joshua Alston of The A.V. Club gave the episode a B rating, stating that the episode "is a pretty good one, albeit one that hangs a lot of funny lines on a flimsy frame". He further went on to say "But this is part one, a fact the title calls attention to, so it’s necessary to grant the episode a generous amount of leeway. Especially because its as dense with jokes as it is with story, and I laughed consistently, even as I questioned whether this will build to a satisfying conclusion".

Michelle Carlbert of TV Fanatic rated the episode with 4.9/5, saying "this one it going to go down in the history of TV weddings as one of the most unlucky ever" and also laid praise on Cam and Mitchell's storyline.

Jeremy Peeples of Rant Lifestyle gave the episode a mixed review, saying: "As the first part of a two-part story, this was fine, but things were a bit predictable since you knew with it being a two-parter, the wedding wouldn't happen here." Peeples also criticized the gift story line and described it as a "C-level story", but admitted the scene where Alex sticks up for Phil was "touching".

Victoria Leigh Miller of Yahoo TV gave the episode a mixed review, criticizing the fact Shelley Long's character did not appear at all, and said that the absence of the character "left more time for silly side story lines like Phil's (Ty Burrell) faux blindness after an eye doctor appointment — seriously, who gets their eyes dilated on the morning of a major family wedding? — and Lily's impromptu merry-go-round ride on a dry-cleaning conveyor."

=== Part 2 ===
"The Wedding Part 2" received mixed reviews.

Joshua Alston from The A.V. Club gave the episode a B rating, praising the emotions that the writers brought in the episode. "[The] episode does a fine job with the emotional beats of Mitch and Cam’s wedding, finally dealing substantively with the rift between Jay and Mitch and giving Jay an opportunity to redeem himself."

Leigh Raines from TV Fanatic rated the episode with 4/5 saying: "[The] best part though was when [Jay] told Mitchell, they should take a little walk...down the aisle. You're damn right I teared up when Jay and Gloria walked Mitchell down the aisle and Merle and Barb walked Cam down. That's the way it always should have been."

For his performance in the episode, Nathan Lane was nominated for the Primetime Emmy Award for Outstanding Guest Actor in a Comedy Series.
