= The Feud (Modern Family) =

- Modern Family episode
- Episode no.: Season 5 Episode 15
- Directed by: Ryan Case
- Story by: Christopher Lloyd
- Teleplay by: Dan O'Shannon
- Production code: 5ARG14
- Original air date: February 26, 2014

Guest appearances
- Rob Riggle as Gil Thorpe; John Heard as Gunther Thorpe

Episode chronology
← Previous "iSpy"	Next → "Spring-a-Ding-Fling"
- Modern Family season 5

"The Feud" is the 15th episode of the fifth season of the American sitcom Modern Family, and the series' 111th overall. It was aired on February 26, 2014. The episode's story was written by Christopher Lloyd and the teleplay by Dan O'Shannon. "The Feud" was directed by Ryan Case. Julie Bowen submitted this episode for consideration due to her nomination for the Primetime Emmy Award for Outstanding Supporting Actress in a Comedy Series at the 66th Primetime Emmy Awards.

== Plot ==
The elections of the social chair of the realtor group are on, and Phil (Ty Burrell) is nervous waiting for the results. While waiting, Gil Thorpe (Rob Riggle) comes to inform him that he won this year and asks Phil to pass the medallion to him. Phil is not happy at all with the result and thus, reluctantly gives the medallion to Gil.

Claire (Julie Bowen) has an important meeting with a client that Mitchell (Jesse Tyler Ferguson) has arranged for her. She is so nervous about it that when Mitchell and Cam (Eric Stonestreet) ask her to babysit Lily (Aubrey Anderson-Emmons) for them, she takes her to the park to get her mind off of the meeting. Later, Cam gets a phone call from Lily's school for a lice breakout and he, along with Mitch, decide not to tell Claire before the meeting to not stress her more. It turns out that Claire got lice from Lily after all. Mitchell tells her about the lice situation during the meeting and she gets mad at him for not telling her sooner; she ended up infecting the client she has the meeting with.

In the meantime, Jay and Phil go to watch Luke's (Nolan Gould) wrestling match and tell him that no matter the result he will be proud of him and that he should just have a good time. Phil changes his mind and tells Luke that he has to win when he finds out that Luke is wrestling Gil's son. Jay does not agree with Phil's advice and tells Luke that he should enjoy the match no matter what. When he sees who Gil's father, Gunther (John Heard), is, he also wants Luke to win since that man always appears in front of him at his "weak" moments and embarrasses him.

Jay (Ed O'Neill) drops off Gloria (Sofía Vergara) and Manny (Rico Rodriguez) at a museum and leaves for Luke's match. At the museum, Manny discovers that his shoes are squeaking and he does not want to feel embarrassed in front of his friends. Gloria tries to teach him that he should not care what other people think of him and to be confident, but she does the exact opposite when an allergic reaction appears on her face, making her hide from the other mothers. Manny distracts the mothers and his friends with his squeaky shoes while Gloria flees the museum, but he ended up getting nicknamed for the pink shirt he was wearing instead.

Meanwhile, Alex (Ariel Winter) and Haley (Sarah Hyland) try to transfer something at the basement and they get stuck there because of an opossum, while Cam tries to stay away from Lily as much as he can due to the lice. Cam calls Phil to ask him if they have anything against lice and Phil sends him to the basement. Haley and Alex set up a trap for the possum but unfortunately Cam was the one who triggers it; as such the possum is still alive. This makes the three of them panic; at the same time, Claire returns home from the meeting and, after looking at her disheveled state, the four of them panic even more.

== Reception ==
=== Ratings ===
In its original American broadcast, "The Feud" was watched by 8.52 million; down by 1.35 from the previous episode.

=== Reviews ===
"The Feud" received generally positive reviews from critics.

Joshua Alston from The A.V. Club gave a B rating to the episode, calling the Gloria-Manny sub-plot smart "because it felt so organic to the characters, with Gloria [...] learning the concept of shame" but criticizing the Luke-Phil-Jay story, feeling that even though Burrell gave a good performance, the character of Thorpe was overused.

Madina Papadopoulos from Paste Magazine rated the episode with 6/10 saying the Phil-Thorpe scenes received too little air-time: "What should have been the main storyline took the backseat to some less interesting plot points. [...] This week, the Thorpe-Dunphy rivalry should have been the heart of this episode, but timewise, it was treated like a C-storyline that wasn’t really developed."

Laigh Raines of TV Fanatic rated the episode with 4/5 commenting on Thorpe's new appearance, "sometimes he is really annoying but I actually found him pretty funny this week. He's such a pain in the ass but his dumb humor is sometimes right on key. I can't believe Gil's dad was Jay's nemesis."
