= The Late Show (Modern Family) =

- Modern Family episode
- Episode no.: Season 5 Episode 5
- Directed by: Beth McCarthy-Miller
- Written by: Abraham Higginbotham
- Production code: 5ARG06
- Original air date: October 16, 2013

Guest appearance
- Jessalyn Wanlim as Fiona

Episode chronology
← Previous "Farm Strong"	Next → "The Help"
- Modern Family season 5

"The Late Show" is the fifth episode of the fifth season of the American sitcom Modern Family, and the series' 101st overall. It aired on October 16, 2013. The episode was written by Abraham Higginbotham and directed by Beth McCarthy-Miller. The episode deals with the difficulties that can arise in relationships and the petty squabbles that can have injurious effects for those close.

== Plot ==
Jay (Ed O'Neill) has made a reservation for the family at a restaurant that he has had to wait six weeks for. However, when the time comes, no one is ready.

Gloria (Sofía Vergara) takes ages to get ready after she came home late from the hairdresser. When she finally comes downstairs, Haley (Sarah Hyland), who is there to babysit Joe, remarks that her earrings aren't big enough, so they both head back upstairs. Jay tries to remain calm about the whole situation and asks Manny (Rico Rodriguez) to tell Gloria to hurry for him. Gloria and Haley come downstairs, but when Gloria needs to go change her lipstick, Jay reaches his breaking point and admonishes her for always being late, as well as rude for making everyone else wait for them. When they arrive at the restaurant, they discover that they are the first ones there and cannot be seated until the whole party is present.

At the Dunphy house, Phil (Ty Burrell) has put on a new suit to look nice for Claire (Julie Bowen), but it's too tight and he can barely move in it. Claire comes home from work but she does not notice the suit. She is stressed from work and she is upset to learn that Phil has allowed Luke (Nolan Gould) to stay home alone at his request (with Haley watching baby Joe and Alex (Ariel Winter) watching Lily (Aubrey Anderson-Emmons) while they're all out). Phil tries to convince her that Luke is going to be okay and that he is old enough to stay home alone, with not much luck. On their way to the restaurant, Claire has a feeling that something is wrong and they return home to check on Luke, who mistakes Claire for an intruder and blasts her with a paintball gun as soon as she enters. Claire's warnings of intruders have scared him and now he needs to be driven over to Jay's to be with Haley and Manny.

Cam (Eric Stonestreet) and Mitch (Jesse Tyler Ferguson) are also late because Cam cannot decide what to wear. When he is finally ready, they realize they've worn the same outfits (again). They ask Alex and Lily to be the judges because neither wants to change. The girls refuse to get involved, so they both agree to change. While Mitch is changing, Cam stalls while trying to figure out what to wear, prompting Mitch to accuse him of manipulating the situation so that, with the shortage of time, he will get to keep his current outfit on.

Everyone eventually arrives at the restaurant. But even there, Cam and Mitch "need a moment", heading back out to discuss their disagreements. As soon as they're done, Claire and Phil need to do the same. When they are all finally ready to be seated, Fiona (Jessalyn Wanlim), the hostess, informs Jay that she has given their table away, just as she had warned him that she would have to do. Gloria starts yelling at her in an attempt to get them a table, but ends up getting them all kicked out of the restaurant.

Serendipitously, there's a taco truck across the street. Jay sets his sights on it and they end up having Mexican for dinner. Despite how the night has turned out, they all end up having a great time laughing, singing, and dancing to Jay's favorite song, "Midnight Train to Georgia".

== Reception ==
=== Ratings ===
In its original American broadcast, "The Late Show" was watched by 10.94 million; up 0.30 from the previous episode.

=== Reviews ===
"The Late Show" received positive reviews.

Leigh Raines of TV Fanatic gave the episode a 5/5 rating, calling it the best episode in a long time and that it should have been the series' 100th one. "Most of all, I loved that they all ended up having a great meal at the taco truck, dancing, singing, drinking and watching Phil split his suit. Those are the best nights. The ones where the "perfect" plan falls through and something entirely better unfolds. That's what I love about Modern Family."

Britt Hayes of Screen Crush gave a positive review, saying that the episode was a serious improvement over previous ones. "Sitcoms are formulaic, but the reason that ones like ‘Modern Family’ stick around for so long is that they have such great characters and often charming writing that we can forgive the repetitive nature and just have a good time. Like the characters on tonight’s episode, we could all stand to relax and have a little fun every week."

Joe Reid of The A.V. Club gave the episode a B− rate stating that the show has repetitive payoffs. "Whether these payoffs made their respective lumbering, uninspired, frequently unpleasant setups worth it is another story. [...] This is a show that's gotten very comfortable with relying on voice-overs or come-together moments in order to give the illusion of heartwarming family comedy, but I think they deliver on that promise only half the time. Or all the time but half as effectively. Like Haley said, too much math."

Martina Maio of TheCelebrityCafe.com gave the episode 5 stars saying that it was "one of the strongest yet this season". "The episode was filled to the brim with comedic moments with all three families and dealt with some very average family issues."

Wyner from TwoCentsTV said that the episode was "cute", "focused on family time management" and that "the character personalities shone".
