= Spring-a-Ding-Fling =

- Modern Family episode
- Episode no.: Season 5 Episode 16
- Directed by: Gail Mancuso
- Written by: Ben Karlin
- Production code: 5ARG16
- Original air date: March 5, 2014

Guest appearances
- Aisha Tyler as Wendy; Will Sasso as Señor Kaplan; Alyson Reed as Angela; Marc Evan Jackson as Tad; Joe Wengert as Elliot

Episode chronology
← Previous "The Feud"	Next → "Other People's Children"
- Modern Family season 5

"Spring-a-Ding-Fling" is the 16th episode of the fifth season of the American sitcom Modern Family, and the series' 112th overall. It was aired on March 5, 2014. The episode was written by Ben Karlin and directed by Gail Mancuso. Ty Burrell won the Primetime Emmy Award for Outstanding Supporting Actor in a Comedy Series for his performance in this episode.

Rico Rodriguez does not appear in this episode.

== Plot ==
Mitch (Jesse Tyler Ferguson) has accepted a new job and he is excited while preparing for his first day. Wendy (Aisha Tyler), his boss, tries to show him the office and introduce him to his co-workers but a series of misunderstandings leads Mitch to believe that Wendy is a monster who treats people poorly. He decides to stand up and tells her how horrible she is and when he realizes that he was mistaken and misinterpreted her signs, he apologizes.

Cam (Eric Stonestreet) gets to run the school's spring dance and he is excited. Everything goes perfect for him until the moment Señor Kaplan (Will Sasso), the former Spanish teacher of the school, appears and steals his spotlight. Cam feels excluded and he does everything he can to outdo him. When the moment the faculty gets to dance comes, he gets on the dance floor to show his dance moves but Señor Kaplan joins him leading Cam to grab Claire (Julie Bowen), who is the chaperone of Alex (Ariel Winter) and Luke (Nolan Gould), and start dancing with her, catching him by surprise.

Claire wants to help Alex and Luke with their dates. She first helps Rhonda (Arden Belle), Luke's date, to dress more like a girl and be beautiful. Luke is not happy with that because he preferred her the way she was and asks Claire to "fix" her. As for Alex, Claire believes that Alex likes Drew (Joey Luthman) but she is afraid to say it so she tells Drew that she and Phil (Ty Burrell) will be back home late and she would like for him to keep Alex company till they get back. Alex also objects to Claire's meddling.

Jay (Ed O'Neill) and Gloria (Sofía Vergara) have to babysit Lily (Aubrey Anderson-Emmons) since Mitch is at work and Cam at the school's spring dance. Lily breaks Gloria's phone by accident but when she is asked who did it, she blames Joe, Jay and Gloria's son. Jay and Gloria do not believe her and try to make her confess the truth with not much success. Lily also knocks over her baby powder but covers her tracks by claiming that Joe can walk and faking his footsteps. Jay and Gloria still don't believe Lily but lucky for her, he does know how to walk and she is exonerated (though she later tries to put on the shoes covered with baby powder on Joe, but the shoes are put on the wrong feet; when confronted by Mitchell, Cam, Jay and Gloria, she still claims she is innocent).

Phil has to host the realtor's banquet and asks Haley (Sarah Hyland) to escort him since Claire has to chaperone Alex and Luke. Haley is texting during Phil's performance, something that distracts him and makes him fall off the stage and hurt his foot. Phil is disappointed at Haley because she was apparently not paying attention to him while performing, but when he wins the big award of the night, Haley accepts it for him because he cannot walk. Haley then finishes Phil's performance, relying on her memory of his rehearsals at home, which moves Phil and makes him proud.

== Reception ==
=== Ratings ===
In its original American broadcast, "Spring-a-Ding-Fling" was watched by 9.22 million; up by 0.70 from the previous episode.

=== Reviews ===
"Spring-a-Ding-Fling" received positive reviews from critics, with many praising Ty Burrell's performance.

Joshua Alston from The A.V. Club gave an A− rating to the episode, praising its cold open and saying it "felt like an uptick from the beginning [...] none of the plots in "Spring" sputtered or faded away in the third act, as has often been the case with the episodes this season. It's a finely tuned, admirably paced episode that easily stands among this season's three best."

Leigh Raines of TV Fanatic rated the episode with 4.5/5 saying: "Most of the characters were doing a little peacock-ing on this latest installment. Since there are a couple of definitions for this out there, let's go with number-five on Urban Dictionary: when someone is blatantly obvious that they are proud of something."

Madina Papadopoulos of Paste Magazine rated the episode with 9.5/10 stating that Phil's performance as a host at the SCARB (Southern California Annual Realtor's Banquet) Awards was an Oscar worthy night. "There are many wonderful moments in this episode. Cam’s dance-off with Señor Kaplan, Claire pimping out Alex to her nerd date, Mitch blasting his boss only to realize she’s actually really nice. But the best scene, what really takes the cake, is Phil’s, "I’m Selling Away" performance, sung to the tune of "I’m Sailing Away." Where do I even begin to praise this moment? It was blissful hilarity."

In addition, Jordan Adler from We Got This Covered gave a positive review to the episode calling it "charming" and "frequently funny". Adler also states that the best plot was Mitch's. "Despite a bit of clutter and compression, 'Spring-a-Ding-Fling' was a Modern Family episode that could have run in season two. The one-liners are sharp, the actors receive, for the most part, fresh plots that give them a chance to display their range and the two guest stars do not feel wasted."

== Accolades ==
Ty Burrell submitted this episode for an Emmy nomination & won his second and final Emmy Award for the show.
