= Dana Powell =

American actress

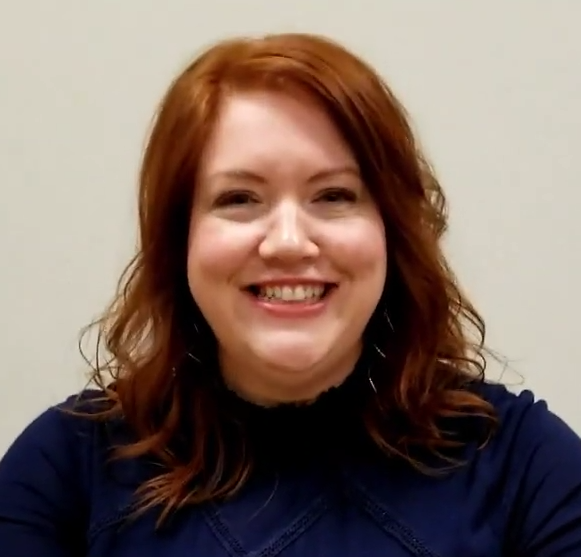
- Powell in 2019
- Born: Springfield, Missouri, U.S.
- Education: Missouri State University (BFA)
- Occupations: Actress; podcaster
- Years active: 2003–present
- Spouse: Dan Tipton
- Children: 1

Dana Powell is an American comic actress best known for playing Pam Tucker, Cam's sister, on Modern Family (2013–2019).

== Early life and education ==
Powell grew up in Springfield, Missouri, where she went to Hillcrest High School. She developed an interest in theater after an unsuccessful audition for Fiddler on the Roof as a high school freshman. Her first acting role was the housekeeper in a high school production of The Sound of Music. After briefly attending Ozarks Technical Community College, she earned a bachelor's degree in theater from Missouri State University in 1999. She worked in the newsroom of Springfield 33 (a radio station later known as KSPR) before moving to Los Angeles to study improvisational comedy at the iO West and the Upright Citizens Brigade Theatre.

== Career ==
An early television role for Powell was on Reno 911! in 2005. She played a flight attendant in the 2011 film Bridesmaids and had a recurring role on the ABC sitcom Suburgatory (2011–2013). Other guest appearances include on television comedies such as Two Broke Girls, The Office, and Veep.

Powell's best-known role is Pameron "Pam" Tucker, the sister of the main character Cameron "Cam" Tucker (Eric Stonestreet), on the ABC sitcom Modern Family. First appearing in the fifth season episode "Farm Strong" in 2013, she returned for 14 episodes in total. Powell knew Stonestreet from their improvisational comedy days and considered him her "unofficial big brother in real life". Her character was met with controversy with viewers finding her character annoying and unlikeable. Pam Tucker has been cited as being one of the worst supporting characters on the show.

Powell has worked in digital advertising as a writer. She and actress Alison Royer hosted the Absolute Worst Podcast from May 2017 to December 2018. Since 2019, she has hosted The Rants and Raves Podcast with actress Jessica Young.

== Personal life ==
Powell is married to Dan Tipton, who worked as a production supervisor for Modern Family. They met at Missouri State, and not long after graduation he invited her to move to Los Angeles. They have one son.

== Filmography ==
=== Film ===
Year(s)	Title	Role	Notes
2008	Point View Terrace	Helen	Television film
2011	Bridesmaids	Flight Attendant Claire	
2011	Pepper	Jane	Short film
2013	This Is Ellen	Rose	Short film
2014	Donation	Beth	Short film
2015	Salem Rogers	Gwynn	Television film
2016	Piece of Cake	Janet	Short film
2016	Ride Shared	—N/a	Short film
2017	Unit Zero	Midge	Television film
2017	Handsome	Sky	
2017	Alex & the List	Holly	
2017	Battlecreek	Melinda	
2018	To the Grave	Margot Bleeker	Short film
2019	The Breakup Bar	Penny	Short film
2019	Valentino and the Prodigy	Bonzie	Short film
2020	Remotely Working	Kate	Television short film
2020	Film Fest	Toni	
2020	Bite the Hand	Lorrie Caldwell	Short film
2021	The Locals	Jen	Short film
2023	Help Me Understand	—N/a	Short film

=== Television ===
Year(s)	Title	Role	Notes
2005	Reno 911!	American Idol Hopeful	2 episodes
2008	Emily's Reasons Why Not	Mindy Saline	3 episodes
2009	Kath & Kim	Holly	Episode: "Idols"
2009	Brainstorm	Alison	Web series
2010	Svetlana	—N/a	Episode: "Gumption"
2011	Good Luck Charlie	Nancy	Episode: "Driving Mrs. Dabney"
2011–2013	Suburgatory	Rhonda	6 episodes
2012	The Office	Megan	Episode: "Welcome Party"
2012	Bob's Burgers	Karen	Voice role; episode: "Food Truckin'"
2012	2 Broke Girls	Shana	2 episodes
2013	Arrested Development	Crab Shack Worker	Episode: "Queen B."
2013	Hello Ladies	Employee	Episode: "Long Beach"
2013–2019	Modern Family	Pameron Tucker	14 episodes
2014	Veep	Kelly	2 episodes
2014	I Didn't Do It	Brenda	Episode: "Logan's Run"
2014	Mom	Jessica	Episode: "Soapy Eyes and a Clean Slate"
2015	Hot Girl Walks By	Lisa	Episode: "Girls in a Park"
2015	Clipped	Robin Doyle	Miniseries; 8 episodes
2015	In-Between	Agnes McGuire	3 episodes
2016	Food Court	Girl Scout Cookie Defendant	
2017	Temporary	Not The Real Elizabeth Banks	Episode: "The Real Elizabeth Banks"
2017	Flip the Script	The DP	Episode: "Diva Director"
2017	Curb Your Enthusiasm	Claudia	Episode: "The Pickle Gambit"
2018	I'm Still a Person	—N/a	Episode: "The Mom Bob Episode"
2018	Black-ish	Marla	Episode: "Dog Eat Dog World"
2018	The News Tank	Donna Power	Episode: "Ed Balls, Cry Closet, & Poop Trains!"
2018	Ride Sesh	Susan	Episode: "Dave & Susan"
2019	Baby Love	Nurse Bell	Episode: "Pilot"
2019–2020	The Good Place	Paula	3 episodes
2020	Site Unseen	Herself	Episode: "Episode #1.2"
2020	Saved by the Bell	Joyce Whitelady	Episode: "Clubs and Cliques"
2021	Narcos: Mexico	Waitress	Episode: "Como La Flor"
2022	Cars on the Road	Mato	Voice role; episode: "Gettin' Hitched"
2023	9-1-1	Carol Sykes	Episode: "Mixed Feelings"
