= Sleeper (Modern Family) =

- Modern Family episode
- Episode no.: Season 5 Episode 21
- Directed by: Ryan Case
- Written by: Paul Corrigan; Brad Walsh; Bill Wrubel
- Production code: 5ARG22
- Original air date: April 30, 2014

Guest appearances
- Rod McLachlan as Fred; Jonathan Runyon as Keith

Episode chronology
← Previous "Australia"	Next → "Message Received"
- Modern Family season 5

"Sleeper" is the 21st episode of the fifth season of the American sitcom Modern Family, and the series' 117th overall. It was aired on April 30, 2014. The episode was directed by Ryan Case and written by Paul Corrigan & Brad Walsh & Bill Wrubel.

In the episode, the family gets ready for the first family portrait to include Joe. Phil promises Claire that he will wait at the house for a washing machine repairman, but lies that he did not arrive when actually Phil left on a crazy errand. Haley joins Luke at a laundromat to wash his black shirt for the photo, but he ends up leaving with some girl's black shirt instead. Gloria believes that Joe may be too "white" for her family so she takes him in the sun before the photo, leading to a bad sunburn and a worse solution from Manny. Claire is upset with Cameron for not using the clothes she gave Lily, while Mitchell is upset when no one notices his presence or absence, not even when they pose for the portrait picture without him.

"Sleeper" received mixed reviews from the critics.

== Plot ==
Claire (Julie Bowen) asks Phil (Ty Burrell) to wait for the repairman of the washing machine since the rest of the family will be absent from home. Phil tells her not to worry but when he receives a call from a discman who informs him that a song (which reminisces him about his first sexual experience) has been re-edited, he rushes to the store to buy it. Coming back home and ready to listen to it, he realizes that it looks like infidelity to Claire and decides to destroy the disc. The repairman comes in his absence and Phil feels guilty about it and lies to Claire by saying that the repairman did not come. Claire believes him and calls the company to protest while Phil can not hide his guilt. Alex (Ariel Winter), who has an AP Biology essay assignment about narcolepsy, notices that her dad constantly falls asleep and knowing that this might be a sign of guilt, she forces him to tell the truth on their way to Jay's (Ed O'Neill) house.

Meanwhile, Luke's (Nolan Gould) black shirt needs to be washed as Gloria (Sofía Vergara) decides to organize a new family portrait since Joe's birth. He and Haley (Sarah Hyland) go to the laundromat where the washing machines are located. Haley manages to distract a guy, who turns out to be an ex-boyfriend, while Luke manages to put his shirt among the guy's clothes. When the laundry is done, the guy comes to take it before Luke's finds his shirt. Haley once again tries to distract him while Luke, instead of his black shirt, he takes a girl's one which he enjoys wearing later.

Claire accuses Cameron (Eric Stonestreet) of being too snobby for not getting Lily (Aubrey Anderson-Emmons) to wear her girls' old clothes that she gives to him. Cameron decides to elaborate a false picture in order to prove Claire that she is wrong but she manages to turn back the tables on him when she recognizes a detail on the picture that uncovers his fraud. Gloria steps in to stop the fighting and makes everyone promise that from now on, no one will pass clothes to another, something that also suits her, since she does not like the clothes Cameron gives her for Joe.

Before the portrait, Gloria notices that Joe's face is too "white" and she can not send a picture to her family in Colombia of her son that does not look even a little bit Colombian. Because of that, she decides to expose him to the sun but this leads to dramatic consequences when Joe ends up with a sunburn. Manny (Rico Rodriguez) saves the day by giving Joe make-up which makes him wear Colombia's flag's colors on his face that hide the sunburn.

As Phil is about to confess to Claire about the repairman, a ring flies off from Lily's clothes, which turns out to be Claire's former wedding ring. Claire confesses that she took it off to flirt her way out of a speeding ticket and then she could not find it. Thinking that she lost it, she did not want to tell Phil because she did not want to frustrate him and she bought a fake one to replace it. Phil, after Claire's confession, does not feel guilty anymore about his lie and he forgives Claire.

In the meantime, Mitchell (Jesse Tyler Ferguson) realizes after a sequence of events during the day, that nobody in his own family really knows him. Jay, and later Claire, seem to ignore that he does not play any instruments or eat ice cream. Mitchell also realizes that he is not in any of the pictures with Lily and tries to tell Cameron but he ignores him. Later at Jay's house they do not even notice he is at the house and he finally gets frustrated when everyone poses for the family portrait but no one seems to notice that he is not among them. Jay comforts him by telling him that he lives his life as he wants while he is embarrassed to say that he wants to take Stella to a dog show as a participant. The dog show starts at the same time as the family portrait was arranged and that is why Jay is so in a hurry to finish with it.

The episode ends with Jay taking Stella to the dog show while the whole family is there to support them. Stella obtains a prize and at the end, she is also part of the family portrait.

== Reception ==
=== Ratings ===
In its original American broadcast, "Sleeper" was watched by 8.39 million; down by 1.2 from the previous episode.

=== Critical reception ===
"Sleeper" received mixed reviews from critics.

Joshua Alston of The A.V. Club rated the episode with a C− and wrote, "What makes 'Sleeper' especially disappointing is how it diminishes Phil, Modern Family's most consistently written character, by putting him in an aimless, unfunny plot that even Ty Burrell couldn't save.". In his review for the following episode, "Message Received", he labelled "Sleeper" as "arguably the worst episode of the show's entire run".

Jordan Adler from We Got This Covered gave a mixed review to the episode. He stated "Even when Modern Family feels hackneyed or rushed, it is hitting its laugh marks. You cannot help but admire the jokes that hit, even if the tone or pacing is off. An episode as manic and overstuffed as “Sleeper” should not work at all, but the cast manages to make the comedy beats work". He closed his review by saying "Sleeper is far from a great episode of Modern Family, but when it works, the comedy is no slouch".

Leigh Raines of TV Fanatic was more positive towards the episode, awarding it a 4/5. She also labelled Lily as the funniest character of the episode, saying "Lily's lines were probably the best part of their scenes in this episode".
