= The Big Game (Modern Family) =

- Modern Family episode
- Episode no.: Season 5 Episode 9
- Directed by: Beth McCarthy-Miller
- Written by: Megan Ganz
- Production code: 5ARG03
- Original air date: December 4, 2013

Guest appearances
- Justin Kirk as Charlie Bingham; Reid Ewing as Dylan; Philip Anthony-Rodriguez as Tim

Episode chronology
← Previous "ClosetCon '13"	Next → "The Old Man & the Tree"
- Modern Family season 5

"The Big Game" is the ninth episode of the fifth season of the American sitcom Modern Family, and the series's 105th overall. It was aired on December 4, 2013. The episode was written by Megan Ganz and directed by Beth McCarthy-Miller.

== Plot ==
Cam (Eric Stonestreet) is under pressure because he wants to become the freshman coach with the most wins in the school's history, and he wants everybody to come to the football game that will give him that record. Cam asks Luke (Nolan Gould) to be the broadcaster of the game, since Reuben is sick. Just before the game starts, Cam and his players learn that the opposing team's coach has died, and that they will play in his memory. Even that does not change Cam's mind, and he wants to win the game no matter what.

Phil (Ty Burrell) notices his children suffer from a lack of optimism and decides to teach them a lesson about how being optimistic can lead things in a positive direction. However, it is near the end of the month and for the first time, he has not managed to sell a single house. He has an important appointment with a client to show one, but when he gets there, he locks himself outside. He tries to get into the house through the window, but when he does, he goes out to get his things and ends up locking himself out again. He gets ready just in time when his clients arrive, only to learn they do not want to buy the house anymore. Phil arrives at the school's football game, upset that his last attempt to sell a house did not go as he hoped.

At the football game, Haley (Sarah Hyland) meets Dylan (Reid Ewing), who is also there. Dylan asks her to go to the movies, but because of an exam, Haley cannot accept his invitation, and Dylan cannot go to the earlier viewing because he has to meet his classmates from nursing school. Later, Haley wants to help Alex (Ariel Winter), who is being ignored by her classmates and treated as if she does not exist. She changes the sign that Dylan carved for her from "Haley Dunphy Do Me" to "Alex Dunphy Do Me".

Jay (Ed O'Neill) drives Claire (Julie Bowen) to work, but her strange behavior makes him curious. Claire continues to avoid him all day (and in past days) or ask for his help at work, only to find out that the reason she acts like that is because she wants her co-workers to see her as an equal, not as the boss's daughter. Claire does not even ask Jay for help when she ends up locked in a closet, something that Jay sees on the security camera while Claire tells him that everything is fine.

Meanwhile, Mitchell (Jesse Tyler Ferguson) has recently received a better job offer and has decided to accept it, which means he has to quit his current job. He does not know how to tell his boss, Charlie (Justin Kirk), and decides to leave him a letter in his office mailbox. He gets to his office, but the moment he leaves the letter, Charlie arrives and tells Mitch that his girlfriend has dumped him and that he has no place to stay. Mitch tries to get the letter back, and after several attempts, he manages to do it, and the two of them go to watch Cam's football game. During the match, Mitchell accidentally drops the letter, and Charlie finds it. Despite the fact that he is sad that Mitch wants to quit, he lets him go.

In the meantime, since Mitch and Cam are busy during the day, Gloria (Sofía Vergara) is responsible for taking Lily (Aubrey Anderson-Emmons) to school and picking her up later. On the ride to school, Lily tells Gloria about Patrick, a boy she likes, but he ignores her. Gloria advises her to make him notice her, but Lily interprets it differently. Lily's teacher informs Gloria that Lily attacked Patrick and tried to kiss him, and now Patrick is afraid of her. Gloria, who does not want to admit she advised Lily, says she will talk to her.

Back at the game, Cam's team wins due to Manny's (Rico Rodriguez) final kick and Cam and the team are over the moon. Manny, though, is not as excited as the others are, since he wanted to miss the kick and let the other team win because they were playing for their coach's memory.

At the end of this episode, Charlie comes to Phil after Mitch encourages him, asking him to sell him a house. Phil is very happy with that because he finally managed to sell a house before the month ended.

== Reception ==
=== Ratings ===
In its original American broadcast, "The Big Game" was watched by 9.47 million viewers, down 0.72 from the previous episode.

=== Reviews ===
"The Big Game" received mixed reviews, with some of the reviewers praising Burrell's acting and Phil's plotline.

Leigh Raines from TV Fanatic rated the episode with 4/5 and praised Burrell's acting. "The star of this episode was probably Phil, although this comes as no surprise to me. Phil is great at doing solo comedy. He made an ordinary locked out of the house situation into a complete act between playing the recorder to the snake and the accidental faux coke mustache."

Madina Papadopoulos from Paste Magazine gave the episode 8.2/10, saying the characters and the episode earn a high score and that all characters are both "unique and relatable". "In an episode about reaching your potential, 'The Big Game' did just that. Modern Family never ceases to impress me. While the episode two weeks ago was a bit of a letdown, last night was back in full swing."

Britt Hayes of Screen Crush said that the episode was "...without a doubt, a vast improvement over the last few episodes [...] it's good to see the writers getting back to form with this week's outing." She closes her review saying: "All in all, a big improvement over the last two episodes — 'The Big Game' has definitely got things looking up for ‘Modern Family,’ and while the pre-Thanksgiving break episode wasn't bad (simply middling), it seems like they're picking up steam again. Here's hoping they keep the momentum steady for next week's new episode."

Kate Knibbs of The A.V. Club gave a C+ rating to the episode, stating: "Modern Family can do fizzy concoctions of intricate, intersecting plotlines that coalesce into a touching finale really well. This week’s episode nails its landing, but everything before the closing feels scattershot. There are too many stories and not enough laughs," and adding that the most entertaining plotline of the episode was Phil's.
