= ClosetCon '13 =

- Modern Family episode
- Episode no.: Season 5 Episode 8
- Directed by: Fred Savage
- Written by: Ben Karlin
- Production code: 5ARG08
- Original air date: November 20, 2013

Guest appearances
- Fred Willard as Frank Dunphy; Celia Weston as Barb Tucker; Ann Guilbert as Grams; Randee Heller as Rita

Episode chronology
← Previous "A Fair to Remember"	Next → "The Big Game"
- Modern Family season 5

"ClosetCon '13" is the eighth episode of the fifth season of the American sitcom Modern Family, and the series' 104th overall. It was aired on November 20, 2013. The episode was written by Ben Karlin and directed by Fred Savage.

== Plot ==
Jay (Ed O'Neill) and Claire (Julie Bowen) are out of town because they have to attend the annual Closet Convention. While Claire seems very interested at the schedule of the convention and wants to participate in all the activities, Jay is more interested in meeting old friends, including Rita (Randee Heller), and do the pranks they used to do. Jay wants to put a skeleton in Claire's closet to scare her but because of his awkward behavior in front of her every time Rita is around, Claire believes that her dad had an affair. Claire tries to make Jay tell her the truth but they both end up making confessions, like that Jay tried to get Phil (Ty Burrell) a job in another state so he would break up with Claire, and Claire called immigration to inform them about Gloria (Sofía Vergara).

Phil and Gloria are back home alone with the kids and they plan to all go together to a restaurant. Before they leave, Phil discovers what Jay is hiding in his secret closet; a treasure of antique model toys. He gets so excited with his discovery that he unintentionally breaks one of them, a replica of Apollo 13. They immediately cancel their reservation at the restaurant and they all try to fix the model with Phil's dad, Frank's (Fred Willard), help via Skype. In the meantime, Alex (Ariel Winter) and Haley (Sarah Hyland) fight over the pizza delivery boy that they both like, which becomes more awkward when both of their hair becomes tangled together in an model airplane propeller.

Meanwhile, Mitchell (Jesse Tyler Ferguson) and Cameron (Eric Stonestreet) visit Cam's home farm in Missouri. Mitch doesn't plan on settling in, but after a fight with Cam, he decides to give it a try and embrace the farm life. The problem is that Cam's grandmother (Ann Guilbert), who does not know that Cam is gay nor that he has a kid nor that he is getting married, arrives. Cam asks Mitch to pretend they are not a couple. After they all get stuck in the cellar during a tornado warning, Cam comes out to his grandmother but she does not take the news very well.

== Cultural references ==
The scene where Phil tries fix the final part of the model, is a parody scene reference to the film Apollo 13, where it is necessary to provide a way for the three stranded astronauts to build a carbon dioxide filter from only the objects they have on board.

== Reception ==
=== Ratings ===
In its original American broadcast, "ClosetCon '13" was watched by 10.19 million; down 0.56 from the previous episode.

=== Reviews ===
"ClosetCon '13" received mixed reviews.

Leigh Raines of TV Fanatic rated the episode with 4/5 saying that the episode "was a fun trip to the farm for all".

Britt Hayes from Screen Crush gave a mixed review to the episode saying: "Overall, this week is an improvement over last week's overloaded mess of an episode, if only because we're back down to the basic three-plot structure, but there are no big, stand-out laughs [...] Here's an episode of wholesome, family basic cable comedy where families have simple conflicts that are resolved over the course of 30 minutes with commercial breaks. It's just so basic."

Joshua Alston of The A.V. Club gave a C+ rate to the episode. "Modern Family becomes a high-wire act when it separates its characters into three storylines with no overlap between them. Without a nifty structure to string together the disparate plots, the parts get more scrutiny, because they aren't contributing to a greater whole [...] a shambling episode [ClosetCon '13] with a smattering of funny lines and a sequence that worked far better than it should have, but without a ton of meat on its bones."
