= A Fair to Remember (Modern Family) =

- Modern Family episode
- Episode no.: Season 5 Episode 7
- Directed by: Beth McCarthy-Miller
- Written by: Emily Spivey
- Production code: 5ARG09
- Original air date: November 13, 2013

Guest appearances
- Adam DeVine as Andy; Jordan Peele as Derrick; Madison McLaughlin as Sienna; Dylan R. Snyder as Neal

Episode chronology
| ← Previous "The Help" | Next → "ClosetCon '13" |
- Modern Family season 5

"A Fair to Remember" is the seventh episode of the fifth season of the American sitcom Modern Family, and the series' 103rd overall. It was aired on November 13, 2013. The episode was written by Emily Spivey and directed by Beth McCarthy-Miller.

== Plot ==
The whole family, except for Haley (Sarah Hyland), heads to the school fair where everyone gets something to do. Gloria (Sofía Vergara) signed Jay (Ed O'Neill) up to be a fair cop; Manny (Rico Rodriguez) participates in the cake-baking competition; Alex (Ariel Winter) and Luke (Nolan Gould) fight for the same girl; Cam (Eric Stonestreet) worries about his work as a football coach; and Phil (Ty Burrell) and Claire (Julie Bowen) celebrate their 20th wedding anniversary.

Phil and Claire celebrate their 20th wedding anniversary and they both want to surprise each other with their gifts. Claire, who has a tradition of making the worst gifts, this time has prepared a surprise for Phil at home and she tries to make him go back home. Phil, however, does not want to leave the fair, as he arranged with the band who plays at the fair to sing a song for her. Phil manages to keep Claire at the fair till the time that he would get on stage and sing for her, but his surprise is ruined when their pharmacist, Harold Grossman (Rick Cowling), gets on stage right before Phil is supposed to get on, and sings amazingly. Phil feels frustrated to learn that Claire has loved Harold's singing and does not want to sing anymore, so he goes back home with Claire who surprises him with Chinese acrobats. Phil loves Claire's gift, and Claire manages for the first time to give him a gift which is actually good.

Manny participates in the cake-baking competition, something that Jay does not like since the only participants are old ladies and he believes that Manny does not fit there. Gloria, to get rid of Jay, signs him up to be a fair cop. Gloria, realizing later that Jay was right about Manny not fitting to the competition, decides to destroy Manny's cake so he will not be able to participate. When Manny sees the destroyed cake, he believes that one of the other contestants did it to exclude him from the competition.

Meanwhile, Cam worries about his new job as a football coach since his team has not won a game till now. When one of his students' fathers threatens that he will pull his kid from the team if they do not start winning, Cam freaks out and he tries to intimidate his students to be better players. He finally finds what his team needs to win in Manny.

Jay, as a fair cop, has to be partnered with some other guy named Derrick (Jordan Peele). The problem is that Derrick is the guy who he fought with a few minutes earlier about a parking space. The two of them seem to get along though and they enjoy their duties as fair cops.

Luke has a crush on a girl, Sienna (Madison McLaughlin), and he asks for Alex's help on how to approach her without telling her who the girl is. Alex agrees to help him but Sienna is also the girl who Alex wants to make her best friend. When Claire tells her that Sienna is the girl Luke has crush on, Alex tries to keep him away from her. Their fight in front of Sienna just scares her away.

In the meantime, Haley stayed back home to enjoy Jay and Gloria's pool thinking that no one is home, but Andy (Adam DeVine) the nanny is home, baby-sitting Joe. They run into each other and Andy tells her that she cannot use the pool since Jay and Gloria are not there. Haley does not care what Andy says, and when she is lying next to the pool, Andy tries to collect proof that she was there.

== Cultural references ==
- The episode title references the film An Affair to Remember.
- Harold Grossman sings Foreigner's "I Want to Know What Love Is".
- Claire gave Phil a plate of Planet of the Apes for their anniversary.
- Jay tells Manny that all bakers are girls, giving the examples of Betty Crocker, Mrs. Fields and Little Debbie.
- Cam says casting Russell Crowe in Les Misérables was a bad decision.
- R2-D2 is mentioned by Phil.
- Derrick (Jordan Peele) is hit with a snow cone by a teenager he refers to as “Jean Jacket.” Peele would later use the name for the monster in Nope.
- Hill Street Blues is referred to in the second-to-last line of the episode as Andy tells Jay to “be careful up there,” an homage to the line the sergeant would say at the end of every briefing, “be careful out there.”

== Reception ==
=== Ratings ===
In its original American broadcast, "A Fair to Remember" was watched by 10.75 million; up 0.43 from the previous episode.

=== Reviews ===
"A Fair to Remember" received mixed reviews.

Leigh Raines of TV Fanatic rated the episode with 5/5 stating that she "always loves an episode that brings the whole family together".

Madina Papadopoulos of Paste Magazine rated the episode with 8/10 saying that the episode "had a very classic theatrical structure" and the writing "was brilliantly executed".

Britt Hayes from Screen Crush said that the episode was "all over the place and definitely could have benefited from trimming some of the plots down. This show falters when they try to cram too many stories into one episode, and always seems to shine when they have either a couple of solid A-plots and a B-plot, or a few plots that unify into one plot later on."

Phil Dyess-Nugent from The A.V. Club gave a C+ rate to the episode.
