= Farm Strong =

- Modern Family episode
- Episode no.: Season 5 Episode 4
- Directed by: Alisa Statman
- Written by: Elaine Ko
- Production code: 5ARG04
- Original air date: October 9, 2013

Guest appearance
- Dana Powell as Pam

Episode chronology
| ← Previous "Larry's Wife" | Next → "The Late Show" |
- Modern Family season 5

"Farm Strong" is the fourth episode of the fifth season of the American sitcom Modern Family, and the series' 100th overall. It was aired on October 9, 2013. The episode was written by Elaine Ko and directed by Alisa Statman and deals with the insecurities each character possesses as they encounter discrepancies between how they view themselves and how others view them.

== Plot ==
Cameron's (Eric Stonestreet) sister Pam (Dana Powell) comes for a visit from the farm and Cam and Mitchell (Jesse Tyler Ferguson) are afraid to tell her that they are getting married because they do not want to hurt her feelings, since she is still single and because Cam claims Pam is sensitive on the issue. Lily (Aubrey Anderson-Emmons) is the one who finally tells her. Pam seems extremely happy with the news and shares her own news with them; she is engaged to Cameron's first crush, Bo Johnson. Cam gets really upset hearing that and Pam tells him that no one in the family wanted to tell him because he is too sensitive and they were protecting him, something that contradicts Cam's earlier assertion and makes Cam even more upset.

Luke (Nolan Gould) plays on the school's soccer team and Phil (Ty Burrell) and Claire (Julie Bowen) have to be there every weekend to see him, something that makes them miss their whole weekend. Claire convinces Phil to skip the game this weekend since Luke only sits on the bench and plays for only five minutes. Claire does her errands and then goes to Luke's game because she is bored and has nothing else to do. When she gets there she realizes that Luke plays since the beginning of the game and he has the game of his life. Claire feels guilty for convincing Phil to miss it and she asks Luke not to tell his father that she was there. In the meantime back home, Phil accidentally destroys a bird's nest and kills the baby crows that are inside, something that makes him feel bad for the rest of the day.

Meanwhile, Gloria (Sofía Vergara) has some trouble reading and Jay (Ed O'Neill) and Manny (Rico Rodriguez) try to make her admit that she needs glasses. They are not very successful since every mention to Gloria about glasses just makes her mad and she continues to deny that she needs them.

At the end of the episode, the whole family gathers at Jay and Gloria's house. Cam wants to prove that he is not that sensitive as Pam accuses him to be and asks everyone to tell him things they were hiding from him because they were trying to protect him. Everyone says their part and Claire says when Cam bailed on lunch last week Beyonce was there and Cam, as much as he tries not to show emotion, after hearing Lily admitting that she pretends to fall asleep when he reads to her so he can leave her alone, breaks down in tears and leaves the room but not before saying to Phil that Claire went to Luke's game and Luke was great in it. Phil is mad at Claire for convincing him to skip the game and then she went without telling him but he is very proud of Luke.

Cam, Mitch, and Pam have a talk after all the events and they make Cam see that it is not bad being so sensitive and they all make up, while Gloria finally admits that the reason she gets mad about the glasses is because it is a sign of her becoming old, but she finally accepts that she needs them.

== Reception ==
=== Ratings ===
In its original American broadcast, "Farm Strong" was watched by 10.64 million; down 0.48 from the previous episode.

=== Reviews ===
"Farm Strong" received positive reviews.

Leigh Raines of TV Fanatic rated the episode with 4.5/5 saying that "Cam's sister whirled onto this week's Modern Family and brought a whole bunch of drama from the farm."

In TV.com's review the reviewer stated that the show didn't do a "special" episode for its 100th one like Friends did, but it still was a "hilarious episode".

Britt Hayes from Screen Crush said that this episode focused on sensitivity and stated that: "Overall, this week’s installment is a marked improvement over last week’s so-so episode, thanks to a few big laughs and a whole lot more heart."

Joe Reid from The A.V. Club gave a B− to the episode saying that: "Maybe the show really is, at its base, a show about how three couples who don't really like one another manage to out up with their partner's laundry list of irritating foibles for the sake of keeping their quirky, modern families afloat." but at the end "we know there is love in these three families".
