= The Old Man & the Tree =

- Modern Family episode
- Episode no.: Season 5 Episode 10
- Directed by: Bryan Cranston
- Written by: Paul Corrigan; Brad Walsh
- Production code: 5ARG10
- Original air date: December 11, 2013

Guest appearances
- Elizabeth Peña as Pilar; Reid Ewing as Dylan; Rachel Andersen as Cindy; Charley Koontz as Santa; Matthew Risch as Jotham

Episode chronology
← Previous "The Big Game"	Next → "And One to Grow On"
- Modern Family season 5

"The Old Man & the Tree" is the tenth episode of the fifth season of the American sitcom Modern Family, and the series' 106th overall. It was aired on December 11, 2013. The episode was written by Paul Corrigan & Brad Walsh and directed by Bryan Cranston.

This is the second episode directed by Cranston, with the first being the episode "Election Day". The episode also features Elizabeth Peña's second appearance as Gloria's (Sofía Vergara) mom, Pilar.

== Plot ==
Gloria's (Sofía Vergara) mom Pilar (Elizabeth Peña) comes for a Christmas visit and she drives Gloria crazy. Gloria wants to have some time away from her, so she calls Claire (Julie Bowen) to come by and be with Pilar. Claire thinks she will babysit Joe, but at the end Claire and Pilar get along, and seeing the two women bonding makes Gloria jealous. Gloria tries to "win back" her mom, and she ends up fighting with Claire who also admits that she is jealous of her because her mom comes all the way from Colombia just to spend the holidays with her when her mom does not even take the bus (three hours away) for her and instead sends her a pair of slippers as a gift every year since she was eight.

Jay (Ed O'Neill) takes Manny (Rico Rodriguez) to cut down their Christmas tree since Jay believes that the Christmas tree should be a real one and not fake. After searching for a while, Jay finally finds the "perfect" tree but it is not that easy to cut it down. First the axe breaks and then the saw sticks, so they decide to tie it to the car and pull it. Their attempts fail one after another but at the end, they manage to get the tree in an unexpected way.

Haley (Sarah Hyland) and Alex (Ariel Winter) take a job at the mall as the elf and the wife of the Santa (Charley Koontz) respectively, but things do not go really well when the Santa decides to take a break but never comes back. Kids go crazy asking for Santa, and the two girls end up locked in the little Santa house to protect themselves.

Phil (Ty Burrell) tries to achieve his goal of the year. Last Christmas, he said that he would walk the equivalent of the length to Canada on his elliptical machine, otherwise he will banish the machine to the garage. Luke (Nolan Gould) enters the bedroom, and he tells him that there is no way to make it, but he changes his tone when Phil tells him that if he fails, he will take the machine to the garage. Luke is assigned to take the recycling out to the curb, but he missed a few weeks, so he has been keeping the recycling in the garage. In his attempt to earn some time to get rid of it, he tries to convince Phil that he can reach his goal and he asks for Dylan's (Reid Ewing) help to transfer the recycling.

Meanwhile, Mitchell (Jesse Tyler Ferguson) has to do some last minute shopping since he and Cam (Eric Stonestreet) did not get Lily (Aubrey Anderson-Emmons) the right present, plus the "no gift" invitation from their friend Pepper for his Christmas party turns out to be a "12 gift" invitation. While Mitch tries to shop, Cam and Lily go to a charity event where Cam misinterprets the reason of the event.

== Reception ==
=== Ratings ===
In its original American broadcast, "The Old Man & the Tree" was watched by 10.61 million; up 1.14 from the previous episode.

=== Reviews ===
This episode received positive reviews.

Joshua Alston of The A.V. Club gave the episode an A rating saying that the episode was a "Christmas-themed miracle". "It's no secret Modern Family isn't having its best year, and while the show remains a pleasant enough diversion, it has gradually lowered expectations of it over the last season or two. What a surprise, then, that "The Old Man & The Tree" is the nimblest, most elegantly structured episode all year, and easily the best Christmas show Modern Family has ever done."

Leigh Raines from TV Fanatic rated the episode with 4.5/5. "Everyone knows that the holidays can be a stressful time, full of last minute shopping and family feuds. Modern Family Season 5 Episode 10 was no exception to this rule, but the Dunphy-Pritchitt clan knows how to make it funny!"
