= The Help (Modern Family) =

- Modern Family episode
- Episode no.: Season 5 Episode 6
- Directed by: Jim Hensz
- Written by: Danny Zuker
- Production code: 5ARG07
- Original air date: October 23, 2013

Guest appearances
- Nathan Lane as Pepper Saltzman; Fred Willard as Frank Dunphy; Adam DeVine as Andy; Peri Gilpin as Jeannie; Christian Barillas as Ronaldo

Episode chronology
← Previous "The Late Show"	Next → "A Fair to Remember"
- Modern Family season 5

"The Help" is the sixth episode of the fifth season of the American sitcom Modern Family, and the series' 102nd overall. It aired on October 23, 2013. The episode was written by Danny Zuker and directed by Jim Hensz.

The episode features the fourth guest appearance of Nathan Lane as Pepper Saltzman and the fifth of Fred Willard as Frank Dunphy. It also guests Adam DeVine, Peri Gilpin and Christian Barillas.

== Plot ==
Phil's (Ty Burrell) recently widowed dad, Frank (Fred Willard), is feeling down after being dumped by the woman he was dating. Phil, to make him feel better, invited him to stay with them for the weekend but he ends up staying with them for two weeks. Frank's "visit" causes some troubles between Haley (Sarah Hyland) and Alex (Ariel Winter) who now have to share the same room.

Claire (Julie Bowen) suggests that Frank should go to a therapist to help him deal with his loss but Phil does not agree. They call Jay (Ed O'Neill) to ask his help and Phil, Frank and Jay arrange a night exit to a bar. Phil and Jay leave Frank there alone, since he found a woman to flirt with. On his way home though, he meets another woman, Jeannie (Peri Gilpin), who he brings home with him. The next morning Frank realizes that Jeannie is a hooker and when he tells Phil, Phil tries without success to make her leave before Claire comes back home.

At the Pritchett-Delgado house, Gloria (Sofía Vergara) has trouble finding a nanny for Joe because Manny (Rico Rodriguez) flirts with them. She takes Joe to the park where she meets Andy (Adam DeVine), a male nanny who is also hyperactive, and hires him. Jay and Manny are not happy with this decision because Jay finds it weird to have a male nanny and Manny does not want so much energy in his house as he says.

Meanwhile, Cam (Eric Stonestreet) and Mitch (Jesse Tyler Ferguson) try to plan their wedding but they do not agree on anything, so they decide to ask for help from their friend Pepper (Nathan Lane) who's working as a wedding planner. Pepper's ideas though are a little extreme for them and not what they want and when they tell Pepper he feels insulted and leaves. Pepper's assistant Ronaldo (Christian Barillas) has some ideas that the couple likes very much although they feel guilty to hire him because Pepper is their friend and they do not want to hurt his feelings.

== Reception ==
=== Ratings ===
In its original American broadcast, "The Help" was watched by 10.32 million; down 0.62 from the previous episode.

=== Reviews ===
"The Help" received positive reviews.

Leigh Raines from TV Fanatic rated the episode with 4/5 saying that the episode was "chock full of terrific guests stars". "However, I found that the funniest part of the half hour to be completely word-free. Nothing was better than Lily at the end rolling her eyes and banging her head on the table listening to Cam, Mitchell and Pepper arguing over wedding plans."

Britt Hayes of Screen Crush says that the episode was another "solid" one: ""The Help” is yet another solid episode following two weeks of consistent improvements, proving that ‘Modern Family’ can definitely keep the momentum rolling after the occasional misfire."

Madina Papadopoulos from Paste Magazine rated the episode with 8/10 saying that the episode was a very strong one. "The episode ends with a voiceover by Andy: “Life isn’t easy. Sometimes, we just need a little help. Getting your confidence back, getting on the same page, getting out of your own way.” And with that, another sweet, hilarious, introspective episode of Modern Family has graced television."

Martina Maio of The Celebrity Cafe stated that the episode "was not as encompassing as the past five episodes of the season" but it had its hilarious bits. "Despite the overall connectivity of “The Help," Modern Family manages to deliver an abundance of laughs on this Wednesday evening."

Joe Reid from The A.V. Club gave the episode a B− rate.
