= Larry's Wife =

- Modern Family episode
- Episode no.: Season 5 Episode 3
- Directed by: Jeffrey Walker
- Written by: Bill Wrubel
- Production code: 5ARG03
- Original air date: October 2, 2013

Guest appearances
- Reid Ewing as Dylan; Diane Farr as Diane; Amy Yasbeck as Lorraine; Tyler Ritter as Randall; Efrain Figueroa as Father Marquez

Episode chronology
| ← Previous "First Days" | Next → "Farm Strong" |
- Modern Family season 5

"Larry's Wife" is the third episode of the fifth season of the American sitcom Modern Family, and the series' 99th overall. It was aired on October 2, 2013. The episode was written by Bill Wrubel and directed by Jeffrey Walker.

== Plot ==
Phil (Ty Burrell) finds a new target group for new clients; newly divorced women. He does everything to help them get over their divorce by being a very good friend to them and be there anytime they ask him, in hope that they will also buy a new house from him. Claire (Julie Bowen) is not really happy with all this since now that she has to work too she does not have time to do the stuff she was doing before at home (like going to the grocery store) and she needs Phil's help. She tells him that what he is doing is not the best idea and she proves it at the end when Phil is caught up in the middle of three of his clients.

Mitchell (Jesse Tyler Ferguson) and Cameron (Eric Stonestreet), after accepting each other's proposal, are now up to plan their wedding. After two friends of theirs had broken up because they could not agree on things in matter of their wedding, Mitchell and Cameron decide to leave Cameron in charge so they will not end up fighting.

Lily's (Aubrey Anderson-Emmons) cat, Larry, has been missing for few days and Lily starts asking where he is. Mitchell and Cameron do not want to upset her, so they tell her that Larry will get back home, despite the fact that they are convinced that Larry is dead. Mitchell disagrees with Cameron about lying to Lily and that they have to tell her the truth. Later, when Cameron tries to tell Lily that Larry is not coming back, he tells her the reason: he got married and left with his wife. While saying that, Larry is back home and he changes his story by telling Lily that Larry's wife died. Cameron plans a funeral for Larry's wife but goes overboard and it ends up being a disaster, making Cameron have second thoughts about planning the wedding alone.

Mitchell tries to convince himself that he is not nervous about leaving Cameron in charge for the wedding. He leaves to go the gym but he stops by his office first. At the office, he starts cleaning everything, due to his stress about the wedding, and he ends up trapped in the ventilation system. A co-worker happens to be at the building and he helps him get out. After this, Mitchell realizes that he wants to get involved in the wedding. He gets back home and both, Cameron and Mitchell, agree to plan the wedding together.

At the Pritchett-Delgado home, Gloria (Sofía Vergara) is worried about Joe being tough and aggressive and she tells Jay (Ed O'Neill) that Joe is acting like that because of the curse in her family. Jay tells her not to be worried and that there is no such thing as a curse, but Gloria calls Father Marquez (Efrain Figueroa) to ask for his help.

In the meantime, Luke (Nolan Gould) hangs out with some friends at his home for a poker game. One of his friends has not kissed a girl before and Luke tricks Alex (Ariel Winter) so his friend can kiss her. Haley (Sarah Hyland) tries to get into the poker game because as she believes she always wins. However, both end up losing all their money, plus Haley's computer, and they have to ask Alex for her help getting them back.

== Reception ==
=== Ratings ===
In its original American broadcast, "Larry's Wife" was watched by 11.12 million; down 0.52 from the two previous episodes that aired together as season's premiere.

=== Reviews ===
"Larry's Wife" received mixed reviews with most critics criticizing that there were too many stories in a 30-minute episode.

Leigh Raines from TV Fanatic rated the episode with a 4/5 saying about the wedding plans of Mitch and Cam: "I loved watching Cam and Mitchell try and balance the wedding planning. [...] Can't wait to see more wedding planning with those two. They make what I normally find a painful task seem amusing."

Joe Reid of The A.V. Club gave a C− to the episode saying that even though this season started so well with the two premiere episodes, in this episode he was "trying very hard" to find something to like. "Five storylines in 30 minutes, one of which was even passably enjoyable. It is really not my intention to use this show as a punching bag, and I eagerly await a return to last week’s form of middlebrow decency."

Britt Hayes from Screen Crush also commented on the many stories of the episode but she also stated that this week's episode "covers all the basics of relationships: trust, shared responsibility, and what happens when you neglect what’s important." About the many stories she said: "What ‘Modern Family’ can do really well is tie its plots together not with a single, unifying thread, but by having several threads that all bleed into one another in a way that makes the episode thematically coherent. Unfortunately, with so many stories fighting for screen time, it feels like a case of quantity over quality." She closes her review by saying that even though the episode felt way too busy, it was a passable half-hour but it might become forgettable in the scheme of the entire season.

Nora Williamson of TV and Film Review said that the episode was over the top, ridiculous and unfunny and she closed her review saying: "Modern Family works so much better when the families mix and there was none of that in “Larry’s Wife.” I really hope that this episode is just a fluke and that the rest of the season is full of funny, heartfelt episodes that make me understand why I am still watching."
