= Gail Mancuso =

American film and television director

- Born: Gail Susan Mancuso; July 14, 1958 (age 68); Melrose Park, Illinois, U.S.
- Other name: Gail Mancuso Cordray
- Occupations: Film and television director
- Years active: 1984–present
- Known for: Roseanne, 30 Rock, Modern Family

Gail Susan Mancuso (born July 14, 1958) is an American film and television director.

== Early life and career ==
Mancuso grew up in Melrose Park, Illinois. She is married to Brian Downs, a doctor, and divides her time between her homes in Valencia, California and River Forest, Illinois.

Mancuso began her career as an usher of the set of several television talk shows. Later, became a script supervisor for the Showtime comedy Brothers. In 1989, she began serving as associate director for Roseanne. After one of the show's directors left in 1991, she had the chance to become one of the main directors and continued until the show's eighth season. She went on to direct episodes of many television series like Friends, Dharma and Greg and Two Guys, a Girl, and a Pizza Place.

In 2007, Mancuso began working on the CBS sitcom Rules of Engagement. She has also directed episodes of 30 Rock and Scrubs. In 2008, she won a Gracie Award for her work on 30 Rock.

In 2011, she was nominated for a Primetime Emmy Award for her Modern Family episode "Slow Down Your Neighbors". In 2012, she directed Roseanne Barr and John Goodman in the pilot episode of Downwardly Mobile which was commissioned by NBC, but ultimately not picked up. In 2013, she won the Emmy Award for directing episode "Arrested" on Modern Family. In 2014, she won the Emmy Award for directing episode "Las Vegas" on Modern Family.

In 2019, Mancuso made her feature film directorial debut with A Dog's Journey which was the sequel to 2017's A Dog's Purpose directed by Lasse Hallström.

== Filmography ==
Year	Title	Role	Notes
1984–1988	Brothers	Script Supervisor	46 episodes from 1984 to 1986
1987–1990	Just the Ten of Us	Script Supervisor	"First Day at School" (1988)
1988–1989	Day by Day	Script Supervisor	13 episodes from 1988
1988–2018	Roseanne	Director; Associate Director	54 episodes from 1991 to 2018; 89 episodes from 1989 to 1993
1989	Major Dad	Script Supervisor	"Pilot"
1991–1994	Herman's Head	Director	"The Herm from Ipanema" (1994)
1992–1993	Camp Wilder	Director	4 episodes from 1992 to 1993
1993	Joe's Life	Director	"Mind If I Smoke?" (1993)
1993–1999	The Nanny	Director	6 episodes from 1994
1994	Monty	Director	"East Side Story" (1994)
1994–1998	Ellen	Director	7 episodes from 1997 to 1998
1994–1999	Friends	Director	14 episodes from 1995 to 1999
1995	Hudson Street	Director	2 episodes from 1995
1995–1996	New York Daze	Director	"Football Story" (1995)
1995–1996	Almost Perfect	Director	2 episodes from 1995
1995–1998	The Naked Truth	Director	2 episodes from 1997
1996	Love and Marriage	Director	"Here a Case Where Thomas Wolfe Was Wrong" (1996)
1996–1997	Mr. Rhodes	Director	unknown episodes
1996–1997	The Single Guy	Director	"Vegas Finale" (1997)
1996–1997	Ink	Director	"The Debutante" (1997)
1996–2000	Suddenly Susan	Director	2 episodes from 1997
1996–2003	Sabrina the Teenage Witch	Director	2 episodes from 1996
1997	The Tony Danza Show	Director	2 episodes from 1997
1998–2001	Two Guys, a Girl and a Pizza Place	Director	7 episodes from 1999 to 2001
1997–2002	Dharma & Greg	Director	28 episodes from 1997 to 2001
1997–2003	Just Shoot Me!	Director	"In the Company of Maya" (1998)
1998	1973	Director	TV movie
1998	Conrad Bloom	Director	2 episodes from 1998
1998–2000	Jesse	Director	"Touched by an Angel" (1999)
1998–2004	Becker	Director	9 episodes from 2001 to 2003
1998–2007	The King of Queens	Director	"Cello, Goodbye" (1998)
1999	Square One	Director	unknown episodes
1999–2001	Norm	Director	also known as The Norm Show "My Name Is Norm" (1999)
1999–2001	Ladies Man	Director	2 episodes from 1999 to 2000
1999–2000	Stark Raving Mad	Director	5 episodes from 1999 to 2000
2000	Then Came You	Director	"Then Came the Monthiversary"
2000–2001	The Weber Show	Director	also known as Cursed 2 episodes from 2001
2000–2006	Yes, Dear	Director	3 episodes from 2000 to 2001
2000–2007	Gilmore Girls	Director	5 episodes from 2001 to 2003; OFTA Television Award for Best Direction in a Comedy Series (2002)
2001	The Fighting Fitzgeralds	Director	"One Angry Man" (2001)
2001–2002	Three Sisters	Director	4 episodes from 2001
2001–2002	Inside Schwartz	Director	3 episodes from 2001
2001–2007	Reba	Director	7 episodes from 2001 to 2003
2001–2010, 2026	Scrubs	Director	10 episodes from 2002 to 2009 and 2026
2002–2003	In-Laws	Director	"Married Christmas"
2002–2003	Family Affair	Director	"Space Invaders" (2003)
2003	A.U.S.A.	Director	2 episodes from 2003
2003	My Big Fat Greek Life	Director	3 episodes from 2003
2003–2004	The Tracy Morgan Show	Director	2 episodes from 2004
2003–2004	The Mullets	Director	7 episodes from 2003 to 2004
2003–2004	Married to the Kellys	Director	8 episodes from 2003 to 2004
2003–2004	Run of the House	Director	2 episodes from 2004
2003–2015	Two and a Half Men	Director	2 episodes from 2004
2004	The Men's Room	Director	unknown episodes
2004–2006	Joey	Director	2 episodes from 2004
2004–2008	Rodney	Director	3 episodes from 2005
2005–2006	Jake in Progress	Director	"Jake or the Fat Man" (2005)
2005–2006	Stacked	Director	"The Ex-Appeal" (2005)
2005–2006	Out of Practice	Director	"Yours, Mine or His?" (2006)
2005–2007	Living with Fran	Director	2 episodes from 2005
2005–2007	My Name Is Earl	Director	"Burn Victim" (2007)
2006	Nobody's Watching	Director	TV movie
2006	Teachers.	Director	2 episodes from 2006
2006	Thick and Thin	Director	unknown episodes
2006–2007	The Singles Table	Director	"The Work Dinner" (2007)
2006–2008	Men in Trees	Director	"Sink or Swim" (2006)
2006–2008	Happy Hour	Director	2 episodes from 2008
2006–2013	30 Rock	Director	8 episodes from 2006 to 2010; Gracie Allen Award for Outstanding Director — Entertainment Series or Special (2008)
2007	The IT Crowd	Director	TV movie
2007	Nice Girls Don't Get the Corner Office	Director	TV movie
2007–2008	Aliens in America	Director	"No Man Is an Island" (2007)
2007–2008	In the Motherhood	Director	6 episodes from 2008
2007–2008	Cavemen	Director	"Andy, the Stand-Up" (2008)
2007–2012	Chuck	Director	"Chuck Versus the Suitcase" (2010)
2007–2013	Rules of Engagement	Director	17 episodes from 2007 to 2013
2008	The Return of Jezebel James	Director	"Needles and Schlag" (2008)
2008	Five Year Plan	Director	TV movie
2008–2009	Kath & Kim	Director	"Desire" (2009)
2009	Hank	Director	"Dog" (2010)
2009–2010	Better Off Ted	Director	"Get Happy" (2009)
2009–2010	Accidentally on Purpose	Director	"It Happened One Christmas" (2009)
2009–2015	Community	Director; Co-Executive Producer	"English as a Second Language" (2010); 19 episodes from 2013 to 2015
2009–2015	Cougar Town	Director	5 episodes from 2009 to 2011
2009–2018	The Middle	Director	"The Floating Anniversary" (2009)
2009–2020	Modern Family	Director	31 episodes from 2010 to 2020; OFTA Television Award for Best Direction in a Comedy Series (2011, 2013–14); Primetime Emmy Award for Outstanding Directing for a Comedy Series ("Arrested") (2013); Primetime Emmy Award for Outstanding Directing for a Comedy Series ("Vegas") (2014); Nominated - American Comedy Award for Best Comedy Director — TV (2014); Nominated - Directors Guild Award for Outstanding Directorial Achievement in Comedy Series ("My Hero") (2014); Nominated - Directors Guild Award for Outstanding Directorial Achievement in Comedy Series ("Las Vegas") (2015); Nominated - Directors Guild Award for Outstanding Directorial Achievement in Comedy Series ("White Christmas") (2016); Nominated - OFTA Television Award for Best Direction in a Comedy Series (2012); Nominated - Primetime Emmy Award for Outstanding Directing for a Comedy Series ("Slow Down Your Neighbors") (2011); Nominated - Primetime Emmy Award for Outstanding Directing for a Comedy Series ("Finale (Part Two)") (2020)
2010–2011	Outsourced	Director	"Party of Five" (2010)
2010–2011	$#*! My Dad Says	Director	5 episodes from 2010
2011	Mad Love	Director	3 episodes from 2011
2011–2013	Happy Endings	Director	"Big White Lies" (2012)
2011–2014	Suburgatory	Director	"Entering Eden" (2012)
2012	Are You There, Chelsea?	Director	12 episodes from 2012
2012–2013	Ben and Kate	Director	"The Fox Hunt" (2012); Nominated - Women's Image Network Award for Outstanding Film/Show Directed by a Woman (2013)
2012–2013	1600 Penn	Director	"Dinner, Bath, Puzzle" (2013)
2012–2013	Don't Trust the B— in Apartment 23	Director	2 episodes from 2013
2012	Downwardly Mobile	Director	TV movie
2013	Adopted	Director	TV movie
2013–2015	Ground Floor	Director	12 episodes from 2013 to 2015
2014–2015	Cristela	Director	4 episodes from 2014 to 2015
2014–2022	Black-ish	Director	2 episodes from 2016
2015	Your Family or Mine	Director	"Pilot" (2015)
2015	Happyish	Director	2 episodes from 2015
2015	Take If from Us	Director; Executive Producer	TV movie
2015–2016	The Grinder	Director	"The Olyphant in the Room" (2016)
2015–2019	Unbreakable Kimmy Schmidt	Director	"Kimmy Goes to College!" (2017)
2015	Fresh Off the Boat	Director	2 episodes from 2015
2015	How We Live	Director	TV movie
2016	The Enforcers	Director	TV movie
2016–2020	Man with a Plan	Director	6 episodes from 2017 to 2020
2017–2018	Superior Donuts	Director	"Get It, Arthur" (2017)
2017–2018	Great News	Director	"Celebrity Hacking Scandal" (2017)
2018	So Close	Director	TV movie
2018–2020	The Conners	Director	10 episodes from 2019 to 2020
2019	A Dog's Journey	Director	Feature Film
2020	Indebted	Director	"Everybody's Talking About Dav" (2020)
2021–2023	Home Economics	Director	4 episodes from 2021 to 2023
2021	Brooklyn Nine-Nine	Director	Episode: "PB&J"
2021	Turner & Hooch	Director	Episode: "In The Line of Fur"
2021	The Big Leap	Director	2 episodes
2023–2024	That '90s Show	Director	16 episodes
2023	Not Dead Yet	Director	Episode: "Not Out of High School Yet"
2025–2026	Will Trent	Director	2 episodes
