= Abraham Higginbotham =

American writer and producer (born 1970)

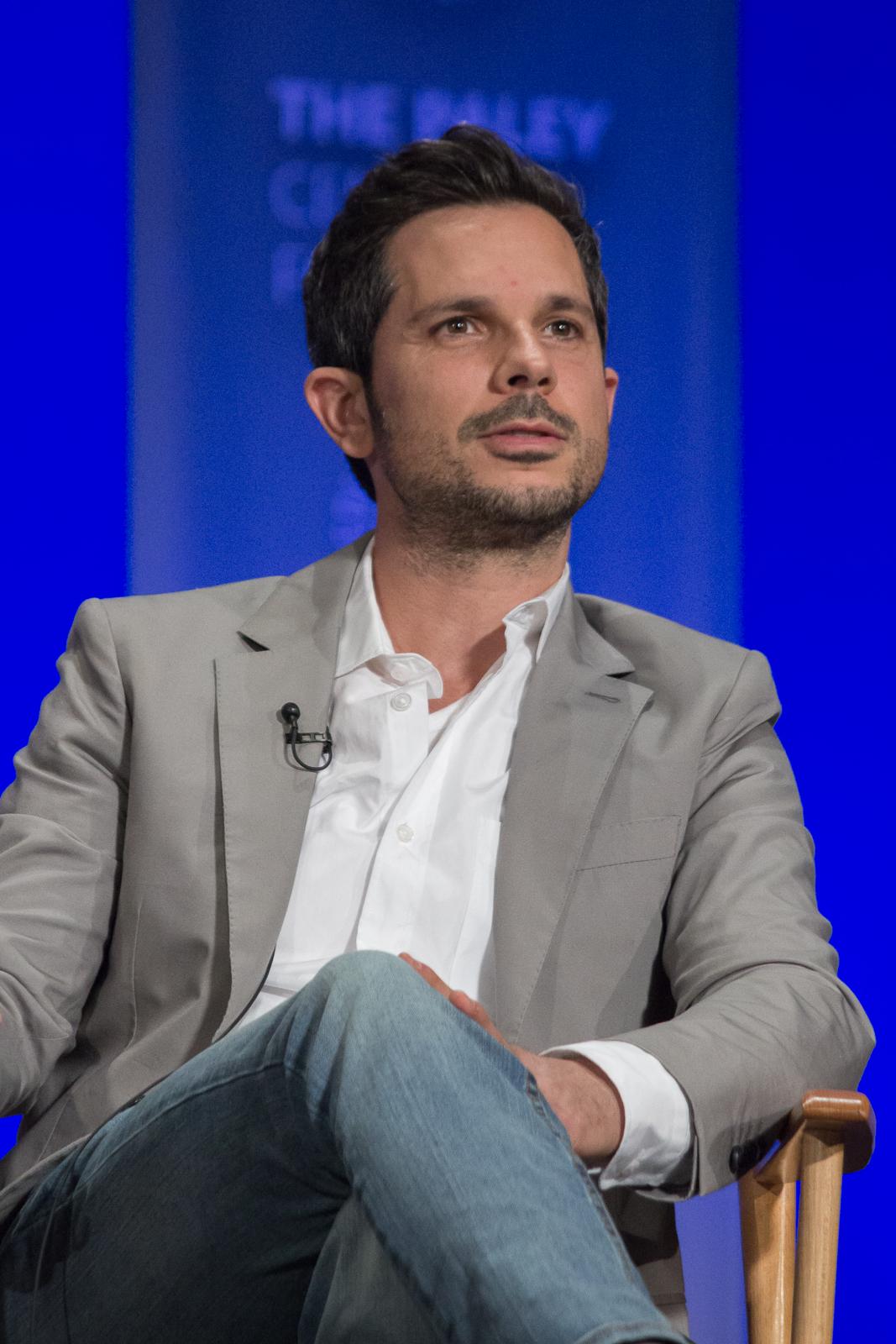
- Higginbotham at the 2015 PaleyFest for the show Modern Family
- Born: January 10, 1970 (age 56); Washington, Pennsylvania
- Years active: 1997–present

Abraham Higginbotham is an American writer, producer, and occasional actor for popular comedy series such as Arrested Development, Will & Grace, Back to You and Do Not Disturb.

== Career ==
Higginbotham began his career in television by submitting a spec script for Will & Grace, and from 2005 to 2006, served as a producer for the show. In 2007, he served as co-executive producer for Back to You and in 2008 served as an executive producer for Do Not Disturb. Since 2010, Higginbotham has served as a consulting producer for Family Guy, wrote for and produced for Ugly Betty and executive producer and writer for Modern Family.

In November 2018, it was announced that Higginbotham had co-created an upcoming comedy, Happy Accident for ABC, on which he would serve as executive producer and writer. The series, however, was passed on by the network. In August 2022, Higginbotham executive produced and cowrote 2 episodes of the Netflix series Uncoupled starring Neil Patrick Harris.

== Personal life ==
Higginbotham grew up in Washington, Pennsylvania. He is a graduate of Trinity High School in Washington County and a 1992 graduate of Boston University. He and his partner are the fathers of a son and twin daughters.
