= Dan O'Shannon =

American screenwriter

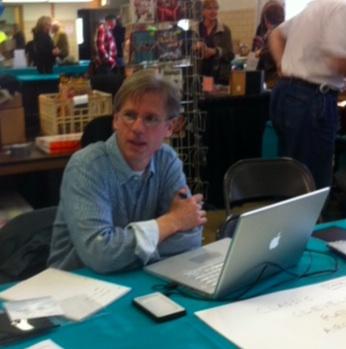
- Born: March 10, 1962 (age 64)
- Education: Riverside High School
- Occupations: Television writer, producer
- Years active: 1985–present
- Notable work: Modern Family; Frasier; Cheers; Newhart

Daniel O'Shannon (born March 10, 1962) is an American television writer and producer who has worked on shows such as Newhart, Cheers, and Frasier. He was an executive producer of the ABC show Modern Family, and left the show at the conclusion of season five to accept a development deal at CBS TV Studios. He grew up in Euclid and Painesville, Ohio, graduating from Riverside High School in Painesville Township.

Aside from television writing (since 1985), he is the author of two books, The Adventures of Mrs. Jesus, published by Harper-Collins (2014) and What Are You Laughing At? A Comprehensive Guide to the Comedic Event, published by Continuum International Publishing Group in 2012.

== Awards, nominations and honors ==
O'Shannon has won six Primetime Emmy Awards and two regional Emmy Awards for his TV work over the past 30+ years (five for Modern Family, and one for Cheers). He has earned five awards and five nominations for Modern Family, three nominations for Frasier and four nominations and one award for Cheers. He produced, wrote, and co-hosted a documentary about kids' TV in his hometown of Cleveland, Ohio titled The Golden Age of Kids' TV: Cleveland and for that he was awarded two regional Emmy awards- one for Best Nostalgia, and one for Writer Short/Long Form Content. He has received five Writers Guild of America Awards (WGA) awards including three for Modern Family, one for Frasier, and one for a special television event, Time-Warner Presents the Earth Day Special. He has received several Golden Globe Awards

O'Shannon received an Academy Award writing nomination for Redux Riding Hood, an animated short produced by Disney. That short film was nominated for an Annie Award. He wrote and produced The Fan and the Flower, an animated short which received an Annie Award.

== Television writing and producing credits ==
O'Shannon has several television writing and producing credits including Modern Family, on which he served as an executive producer for seasons 3 through 5, a co-executive producer for seasons 1 and 2, and he is credited as the episode writer (or co-writer) of 10 episodes.

Prior to joining the writing/producing staff of Modern Family, he worked as a co-executive writer/producer for Better Off Ted, writing two episodes. He may be best known as a co-executive producer of Frasier; he also wrote/co-wrote seven episodes for that series. He was a writer/co-writer of 18 episodes, an executive story editor for season 8, a co-producer for season 9, a co-executive producer for season 10, and the executive producer/showrunner for season 11, for Cheers.

Other writing or producing credits include The King of Queens, as creative consultant for season 1; Suddenly Susan, on which he was a co-executive producer of season 1, a creative consultant for season 2, and a writer/co-writer of 4 episodes; The Boys, on which he was creator and executive producer for 6 episodes and writer or co-writer of four episodes; Newhart, on which he was the story editor of season 7, and a writer or co-writer of 7 episodes; and It's a Living, on which he was a staff writer for the 1985 season (and the writer of 1 episode).
