= A Stereotypical Day =

- Modern Family episode
- Episode no.: Season 8 Episode 2
- Directed by: Ryan Case
- Written by: Vali Chandrasekaran
- Production code: 8ARG03
- Original air date: September 28, 2016

Guest appearance
- Ernie Hudson as Miles

Episode chronology
← Previous "A Tale of Three Cities"	Next → "Blindsided"
- Modern Family season 8

"A Stereotypical Day" is the second episode of the eighth season of the American sitcom Modern Family. It aired on September 28, 2016 on American Broadcasting Company (ABC). The episode is directed by Ryan Case and written by Stephen Levitan.

== Plot ==
Alex (Ariel Winter) gets mononucleosis during the summer vacation. Claire (Julie Bowen), Phil (Ty Burrell) and Luke (Nolan Gould) all try to use her condition to their advantage. Claire wants Alex to be the boring member of the family so she can be fun, Phil had a traumatic experience after he accidentally locked himself in a closet for 18 hours during an open door day and is denied a therapy dog and Luke wants Alex’s laptop in order to copy all her homework. Alex finally breaks down and wants to go back to Caltech, encouraged by Haley (Sarah Hyland) who is worried that Alex will discover that she's been fired from her job.

Mitchell (Jesse Tyler Ferguson) and Cameron (Eric Stonestreet) learn that Lily (Aubrey Anderson-Emmons) made a new friend, Tom (Jackson Millarker) who identifies as transgender. They overhear her call him a weirdo, and worry about her having a judgemental attitude. They visit Jay (Ed O'Neill) and Gloria (Sofía Vergara) for advice, who make them realize that they in turn need to tolerate her beliefs even if they don't agree with them. They later learn that Lily only called Tom a weirdo because he insulted the couple due to the mural on Lily's wall that Cameron painted the day they brought her home. Mitchell and Cameron apologize, and Lily admits that she hates the mural too. The two agree to paint over it, but feel better when they see Lily has a framed photo of it next to her bed.

Manny (Rico Rodriguez) wants to be a communist so he can please a girl he met during the wedding and Joe (Jeremy Maguire) decides to live outdoors. Jay decided to put security cameras in his garden but on the same day, an African American family moves into the house opposite his. Not wanting to appear racist, Jay overcompensates, only to be reassured by his new neighbor Shawn.

== Reception ==
Kyle Fowle of The A.V. Club gave the episode a C−.
