= Modern Family season 9 =

Season of television series

Modern Family
- Season 9
- DVD cover
- Starring: Ed O'Neill; Sofía Vergara; Julie Bowen; Ty Burrell; Jesse Tyler Ferguson; Eric Stonestreet; Sarah Hyland; Ariel Winter; Nolan Gould; Rico Rodriguez; Aubrey Anderson-Emmons; Jeremy Maguire
- No. of episodes: 22

Release
- Original network: ABC
- Original release: September 27, 2017 – May 16, 2018

Season chronology
- ← Previous; Season 8 Next → Season 10

The ninth season of the American television sitcom Modern Family aired on ABC from September 27, 2017 to May 16, 2018.

The season was produced by 20th Century Fox Television, Steven Levitan Productions, and Picador Productions, with creators Steven Levitan and Christopher Lloyd as showrunners. This season was ordered, along with the tenth season, on May 10, 2017.

== Cast ==
=== Main cast ===
- Ed O'Neill as Jay Pritchett
- Sofía Vergara as Gloria Pritchett
- Julie Bowen as Claire Dunphy
- Ty Burrell as Phil Dunphy
- Jesse Tyler Ferguson as Mitchell Pritchett
- Eric Stonestreet as Cameron Tucker
- Sarah Hyland as Haley Dunphy
- Ariel Winter as Alex Dunphy
- Nolan Gould as Luke Dunphy
- Rico Rodriguez as Manny Delgado
- Aubrey Anderson-Emmons as Lily Tucker-Pritchett
- Jeremy Maguire as Joe Pritchett

=== Recurring cast ===
- Dana Powell as Pam Tucker
- Marsha Kramer as Margaret
- Chris Geere as Arvin Fennerman
- Mira Sorvino as Nicole Rosemary Page
- Christian Barillas as Ronaldo

=== Guest cast ===
- Joe Mande as Ben
- Vanessa Williams as Rhonda
- Rob Riggle as Gil Thorpe
- Nathan Lane as Pepper Saltzman
- Chazz Palminteri as Vincent "Shorty"
- Shelley Long as DeDe Pritchett
- Chris Martin as himself
- Terry Bradshaw as himself
- Billy Crystal as himself
- James Van Der Beek as Bo Johnson
- Fred Willard as Frank Dunphy
- Fred Savage as Caleb
- Cheyenne Jackson as Max
- Sarah Baker as Shirl Chambers
- Kevin Daniels as Longinus
- Colin Hanlon as Steven
- George Brett as himself
- Gabriel Iglesias as Jorge
- Alyssa de Boisblanc as Christina
- Jim Piddick as Malcolm Fennerman
- Kate Burton as Iris Fennerman
- Reid Ewing as Dylan Marshall
- Nathan Fillion as Rainer Shine
- Adam DeVine as Andy Bailey
- Mary Louise Wilson as Aunt Becky
- Jane Krakowski as Dr. Donna Duncan
- Harry Groener as Joel L.L. Logan
- Ben Schwartz as Nick
- Toks Olagundoye as Lucy

== Episodes ==
No. overall	No. in season	Title	Directed by	Written by	Original release date	Prod. code	U.S. viewers (millions)
189	1	"Lake Life"	James Bagdonas	Elaine Ko	September 27, 2017	9ARG03	7.01
Jay arranges the whole family for a vacation on a lake to witness the solar eclipse, while also wondering how he will be remembered after his passing. Mitch runs into an old flame and Alex faces the reality of her relationship with Ben. Phil and Claire endeavour to keep up their youthfulness, while the kids' quest for a good time goes awry.
190	2	"The Long Goodbye"	Jim Hensz	Paul Corrigan & Brad Walsh	October 4, 2017	9ARG02	6.36
Phil and Claire realise that Alex may be more self-sufficient in college than they thought; Manny works to avoid a tearful goodbye after Gloria and Jay move him into his dorm; Haley comes across an unexpected opportunity while working her new job at the country club.
191	3	"Catch of the Day"	Fred Savage	Jeffrey Richman	October 11, 2017	9ARG01	6.27
Phil's morning ritual makes him believe that he has an unlucky day coming. Mitch wants to find out why the kitchen rebuild contractor calls Cam "Boss," making him feel like the trophy wife. Jay copes with the absence of Manny at home, as no one can back him up against Gloria.
192	4	"Sex, Lies and Kickball"	John Riggi	Abraham Higginbotham	October 18, 2017	9ARG05	6.22
Jay and Gloria bump into their old friend Shorty in the city and invite him to stay at their house. Pepper's and Ronaldo's adopted son Lionel has a sleepover with Lily and Mitch and Cam question whether Lionel's upbringing is hindering him. Alex takes a bold step in protest of Claire's treatment of Ben.
193	5	"It's the Great Pumpkin, Phil Dunphy"	Beth McCarthy-Miller	Jon Pollack	October 25, 2017	9ARG04	5.96
Everyone else's lack of shared enthusiasm in Halloween makes Phil and Claire wonder if they've outgrown the holiday. Mitch and Cam are frustrated by how long Jay is taking to finish their kitchen remodel, which forces Mitch to finally stand up to his dad. Meanwhile, Gloria's hospitality is wearing thin when Cam oversteps his boundaries as a house guest.
194	6	"Ten Years Later"	Fred Savage	Danny Zuker	November 1, 2017	9ARG08	5.51
Claire organises a garden party for Jay & Gloria's 10th wedding anniversary. Gloria gets upset while preparing for Phil's magic trick for a reason she refuses to accept. Cam convinces Mitch to sing at the party, but the performance drives them to quarrel. Phil struggles to cope with the knowledge that his aspiring career as a magician could have been reality 15 years ago.
195	7	"Winner Winner Turkey Dinner"	Beth McCarthy-Miller	Bill Wrubel	November 15, 2017	9ARG06	5.96
Jay celebrates the high profile accomplishments of his children during Thanksgiving dinner, but the backstories of Mitch's battle against an intruder and Claire's championship in a 10K run turn out much less than triumphant.
196	8	"Brushes with Celebrity"	Jeffrey Walker	Vali Chandrasekaran	November 29, 2017	9ARG09	6.15
Each of the family members recall their brushes with celebrities. Chris Martin shows up as Phil's client, but Phil has a medical emergency. Jay's annoyance of Terry Bradshaw during jury duty reaches a critical point. Mitch and Cam are eager to be selected by a gardening show host and Manny chats with a famous writer who doesn't bother hiding his displeasure at meeting a fan.
197	9	"Tough Love"	John Riggi	Stephen Lloyd	December 6, 2017	9ARG10	5.81
Phil decides to go in the woods alone for one week with the goal of proving his strong side, while Claire drives a delivery truck for the very first time. Jay and Gloria are concerned about Manny's older girlfriend and the lessons Mitch attempts to teach Cam and Lily do not wind up as he expects.
198	10	"No Small Feet"	James Bagdonas	Teleplay by : Ryan Walls; Story by : Ryan Walls & Matt Plonsker	December 13, 2017	9ARG07	5.89
Alex and Luke start an online business with a rather peculiar target customer group. Claire lands an unprecedented opportunity for Pritchett's Closets & Blinds, but neither Claire nor Jay is content with the other's reaction. Gloria and Phil have troubles with a house Phil is unsuccessfully trying to sell, while Bo Johnson, Pam's ex-lover and the biological father of her son, shows up.
199	11	"He Said, She Shed"	Jim Hensz	Jeffrey Richman & Ryan Walls	January 3, 2018	9ARG11	5.90
Luke and Phil attempt to conceal the truth behind Claire's request to build a "She Shed" in their backyard being denied by the homeowners' association. Meanwhile, Cam reluctantly goes with Mitch to his therapist in the aftermath of Pameron disclosing a family secret, while Jay enters Joe in a Kiddies' Golf Tournament.
200	12	"Dear Beloved Family"	Gail Mancuso	Bill Wrubel	January 10, 2018	9ARG12	5.81
Phil is hospitalized upon experiencing intense stomach pains and the whole family rushes to his side for support. Claire goes on a hunt for the "Surgery Bear" to help Phil get through the surgery, while Phil's situation provokes Cam into escalating his envy of Mitch's crush and Joe into contemplating the topic of death.
201	13	"In Your Head"	Steven Levitan	Jack Burditt	January 17, 2018	9ARG13	6.24
Manny, Phil, and Gloria search for Luke who has gone missing in what Gloria remembers and Manny perceives as a sketchy neighbourhood. Haley interrupts Alex's college class to seek help for a job interview and her professor Dr. Arvin Fennerman (Chris Geere) candidly addresses his thoughts to Haley. Jay tries to solve a riddle planted by his career nemesis, much to Claire's chagrin.
202	14	"Written in the Stars"	Jaffar Mahmood	Abraham Higginbotham & Jon Pollack	February 28, 2018	9ARG15	4.96
With Gloria allegedely angry about the lack of concern on Jay's side over Valentine's Day, Phil and Claire introduce him to their role playing escapades to spice up their romantic evening. They are thrown out when Gloria is mistaken for a prostitute. Joe develops a crush on Claire. Cam and Mitch are forced to have their dinner next to Luke, who has been stood up. Meanwhile, Haley and Arvin have a night out in which the former finds the two incompatible. Manny is concerned about not preparing a Valentine's card for his mother for the first time.
203	15	"Spanks for the Memories"	James Bagdonas	Paul Corrigan & Brad Walsh	March 7, 2018	9ARG14	5.25
Jay is concerned over a romantic dry spell with Gloria. He later tries to invent new ideas to match up to what he perceives Gloria has been missing. Cam and Mitch throw a party to celebrate a fancy new job, inspiring Cam to buy a grand piano; Mitch later loses the job after his boss was caught embezzling, forcing them to return it the buyer without letting their guests know. Claire crashes their party and meets Sam Turnbull, the editor of a popular magazine, to get herself featured on the cover. Phil reports to Alex that he might be facing possible bullying from a young woman.
204	16	"Wine Weekend"	Beth McCarthy-Miller	Elaine Ko	March 21, 2018	9ARG16	5.56
Haley brings Manny and the adults to her boss' house for a Wine Weekend, but instructs everyone to stay away from a prized tiara. Jay and Claire struggle to keep Stella away from Gloria, who attends a private party hosted by Oprah Winfrey with Mitch. Elsewhere, Phil and Cam hide their love of hip hop from their spouses.
205	17	"Royal Visit"	Gail Mancuso	Teleplay by : Jack Burditt & Jessica Poter; Story by : Jeffrey Richman	March 28, 2018	9ARG17	5.43
Haley brings her genius astrophysicist boyfriend Dr. Arvin Fennerman to the Dunphy house to introduce him to Phil, Claire, and Luke. Alex dates a good-looking and sensible firefighter named Bill, whom she meets when he saves her from a small accidental fire in her room. She is a bit mean to him, as he is not smart. Phil and Claire try to outsmart each other to impress the genius, leading to a mishap in the house. Meanwhile, Jay and Gloria are intimidated by Joe's friend's parents whom Joe idolizes. Cam lies to Mitch and goes to the Royal Palace to watch the game and meets his favorite player (George Brett).
206	18	"Daddy Issues"	Chris Koch	Vali Chandrasekaran & Stephen Lloyd	April 4, 2018	9ARG18	5.61
Jay feels awkward when Jorge, who happens to be Gloria's ex, shows up and has a strong resemblance to Manny. Luke and Joe help Phil find the perfect gift for his anniversary with Claire. Lily's puberty hits Mitch and Cam.
207	19	"CHiPs and Salsa"	Gail Mancuso	Paul Corrigan & Brad Walsh & Bill Wrubel	April 11, 2018	9ARG19	4.97
When Haley hears that her loopy boss is looking for a product with the magical properties of peppers, she tries to gain her favor by convincing Gloria to sell her salsa to NERP. Mitchell gets Cam the police ride-along he's always wanted. Also, Phil and Claire compete against one another, while Luke has a meeting with the dean of a university.
208	20	"Mother!"	Eric Dean Seaton	Teleplay by : Jon Pollack & Ryan Walls; Story by : Abraham Higginbotham	May 2, 2018	9ARG20	4.60
When Dede drops in unexpectedly, Mitchell and Cam come to a realization about her effect on their lives. Phil, Luke, Alex, and Haley all have different bad news to break to Claire and compete about which of them gets to do it during the tiny window of time after her monthly spa day when she's at her most relaxed.
209	21	"The Escape"	Steven Levitan	Jack Burditt & Danny Zuker	May 9, 2018	9ARG21	4.73
Haley meets Arvin’s parents but, when things don’t go as planned, fate leads to an unexpected reunion with all of her ex-boyfriends. Meanwhile, the family seizes on a nursing home visit with Jay’s mean sister, Becky, to settle old scores. But, as Jay, Claire, and Mitchell compete for her time, Phil, Cam, and Gloria end up getting trapped in the home’s basement with no way out.
210	22	"Clash of Swords"	Jim Hensz	Elaine Ko & Stephen Lloyd	May 16, 2018	9ARG22	5.02
Mitchell sneaks out to Hero-Con with Phil. Gloria's dinosaur party for Joe is ruined when her nemesis upstages her with a far bigger and better party next door.

== Ratings ==
Viewership and ratings per episode of Modern Family season 9
No.	Title	Air date	Rating/share (18–49)	Viewers (millions)	DVR (18–49)	DVR viewers (millions)	Total (18–49)	Total viewers (millions)
1	"Lake Life"	September 27, 2017	2.1/8 (15)	7.01	1.5	3.76	3.6	10.77
2	"The Long Goodbye"	October 4, 2017	1.9/7 (15)	6.36	1.3	3.52	3.2	9.88
3	"Catch of the Day"	October 11, 2017	1.8/7 (13)	6.27	1.3	3.28	3.1	9.56
4	"Sex, Lies and Kickball"	October 18, 2017	1.7/7 (14)	6.22	1.3	3.37	3.0	9.60
5	"It's the Great Pumpkin, Phil Dunphy"	October 25, 2017	1.7/6 (17)	5.96	1.3	3.14	3.0	9.10
6	"Ten Years Later"	November 1, 2017	1.5/5 (16)	5.51	1.3	3.04	2.8	8.55
7	"Winner Winner Turkey Dinner"	November 15, 2017	1.7/6 (15)	5.96	1.4	3.36	3.1	9.30
8	"Brushes with Celebrity"	November 29, 2017	1.6/6 (18)	6.15	1.4	3.52	3.0	9.67
9	"Tough Love"	December 6, 2017	1.7/7 (12)	5.81	1.3	3.32	3.0	9.14
10	"No Small Feet"	December 13, 2017	1.7/7 (10)	5.89	—N/a	—N/a	—N/a	—N/a
11	"He Said, She Shed"	January 3, 2018	1.7/6 (9)	5.90	—N/a	—N/a	—N/a	—N/a
12	"Dear Beloved Family"	January 10, 2018	1.6/6 (10)	5.81	1.3	3.28	2.9	9.09
13	"In Your Head"	January 17, 2018	1.8/7 (9)	6.24	1.2	3.03	3.0	9.27
14	"Written in the Stars"	February 28, 2018	1.3/5 (16)	4.96	1.3	3.19	2.6	8.15
15	"Spanks for the Memories"	March 7, 2018	1.4/6 (14)	5.25	1.2	2.90	2.6	8.15
16	"Wine Weekend"	March 21, 2018	1.7/7 (10)	5.56	1.1	2.94	2.8	8.50
17	"Royal Visit"	March 28, 2018	1.4/6 (16)	5.43	1.2	2.95	2.6	8.38
18	"Daddy Issues"	April 4, 2018	1.5/6 (10)	5.61	1.2	3.01	2.7	8.62
19	"CHiPs and Salsa"	April 11, 2018	1.4/6 (12)	4.97	1.2	2.86	2.6	7.84
20	"Mother!"	May 2, 2018	1.2/5 (12)	4.60	1.2	2.80	2.4	7.39
21	"The Escape"	May 9, 2018	1.3/6 (12)	4.73	1.1	2.87	2.4	7.60
22	"Clash of Swords"	May 16, 2018	1.3/5 (9)	5.02	—N/a	—N/a	—N/a	—N/a

== DVD release ==
Modern Family: The Complete Ninth Season
Set Details		Special Feature
22 episodes; 3-disc set; 1.78:1 aspect ratio; English (Dolby Digital 5.1); Subtitles: English, Spanish and French; Runtime: 474 minutes		Gag Reel
Release Dates
Region 1	Region 2	Region 4
September 11, 2018	September 10, 2018	September 10, 2018
