= Finale (Modern Family) =

- Modern Family episodes
- Episode nos.: Season 11; Episodes 17 and 18
- Directed by: Steven Levitan (Part 1); Gail Mancuso (Part 2)
- Written by: Steven Levitan (Part 1); Abraham Higginbotham (Part 1); Jon Pollack (Part 1); Ryan Walls (Part 1); Jeffrey Richman (Part 1); Morgan Murphy (Part 1); Stephen Lloyd (Part 1); Christopher Lloyd (Part 2); Jack Burditt (Part 2); Elaine Ko (Part 2); Danny Zuker (Part 2); Vali Chandrasekaran (Part 2); Brad Walsh (Part 2); Paul Corrigan (Part 2)
- Cinematography by: James R. Bagdonas
- Editing by: Giselle Murillo (Part 1); Christian Miglio (Part 2)
- Production code: BARG17–BARG18
- Original air date: April 8, 2020
- Running time: 42 minutes

Guest appearances
- Elizabeth Banks as Sal; Chris Geere as Arvin; Christian Barillas as Ronaldo; Matthew Risch as Jotham; Rory O'Malley as Ptolemy; Rodrigo Rojas as Stefan; Charlie Trainer as Charlie

Episode chronology
← Previous "I'm Going to Miss This"	Next → —
- Modern Family (season 11)

"Finale" is the series finale of the sitcom Modern Family. It aired in two parts, both on April 8, 2020, on ABC. The first part was written by Steven Levitan, Abraham Higginbotham, Jon Pollack, Ryan Walls, Jeffrey Richman, Morgan Murphy, and Stephen Lloyd, and directed by Steven Levitan. The second part was written by Christopher Lloyd, Jack Burditt, Elaine Ko, Danny Zuker, Vali Chandrasekaran, Brad Walsh, and Paul Corrigan, and directed by Gail Mancuso.

== Plot ==
=== Part One ===
With Haley (Sarah Hyland), Dylan (Reid Ewing) and the twins still living at the Dunphys’, Alex (Ariel Winter) having moved back in after quitting her job, and Luke (Nolan Gould) still there after not going to college, the house is overstuffed. Claire (Julie Bowen) and Phil (Ty Burrell), uneasy with the number of people now living in the Dunphy household, have moved into Phil's recently deceased father Frank's (Fred Willard) RV parked in the driveway. After they are caught out, they host an intervention with Haley, Alex, Luke and Dylan, stating that someone needs to move out as the house is too crowded. The kids are offended, but even as Luke pleads to Phil's emotional side using their close friendship as a pawn, Claire asserts their position. They tell them they have 24 hours to decide, and leave for Mitch and Cam's housewarming party.

Mitch (Jesse Tyler Ferguson) and Cam (Eric Stonestreet), now settled into their new house with their new baby Rexford, are hosting a housewarming party. Ronaldo (Christian Barillas) arrives to set up, but as Mitch shows him around, Cam receives a call, informing him that the coaching job he was rejected for in Missouri is now open again, giving him a dilemma. He tells Ronaldo that he is not taking it, as Mitch is too happy in their new house, and says he will keep it to himself. However, Ronaldo spills the secret and Mitch finds out. Mitch firstly reacts positively in front of everyone, but then he walks away and swears to Claire about the situation.

Gloria (Sofía Vergara) is preparing to say goodbye to Manny (Rico Rodriguez) as he is leaving to travel the world, and she and Joe (Jeremy Maguire) go to Colombia for the summer. Jay (Ed O’Neill) has bought a hideous housewarming gift for Mitch and Cam and organized Joe's haircut, leaving Gloria feeling left out and not needed. As Manny prepares to leave, she feels she is not the go-to person in the house that she once was now that she works as a realtor. As they arrive at Mitch and Cam's party, she says she hates the gift and misses Joe's old hair.

Phil and Claire return from the party emotional that Mitchell will probably be leaving for Missouri and decide they no longer want to sleep in the RV. They agree that they love their crazy household and will tell the kids they can stay. However, when they enter the house, Haley and Dylan inform them they have found a place to live, which is cheap because they know the owner. Next, Alex, who earlier met with her new co-worker Arvin (Chris Geere) and shared a kiss, tells them that they are moving to Switzerland together for work. Then, Luke arrives, telling Phil and Claire that he has been accepted to the University of Oregon and will also be moving out. Upset at this news, Claire emotionally says "I'm going to miss this" to Phil, to which he replies, "Me too".

Later, in the karaoke room, Cam apologizes and Mitch says that he will leave for Missouri, and they inform Lily (Aubrey Anderson-Emmons) before singing a duet of "Endless Love" by Diana Ross and Lionel Richie.

Gloria confesses to Jay that she feels guilty about working , to which Jay tells her she will always be needed by him, Joe and Manny.

The next day, the family gather to send Mitchell and Cam off, with Jay saying he is upset as "both [his] sons are leaving". As the family hug goodbye, they are informed that Mitch and Cam's flight is delayed. Dylan then arrives at the door. He is excited because he thinks the family remembered his birthday. Unenthusiastic, the family says "Surprise!"

=== Part Two ===
As Mitch and Cam's flight is delayed further, the family agree to meet later to say a proper goodbye. During this waiting period, Mitchell and Claire retrieve their old skating trophy and share a sibling moment, dancing to “Hungry Like the Wolf”, their skating song. Also, Phil misunderstands Jay as Jay attempts to learn Spanish, and as Jay asks for a spoon, Phil attempts to spoon him and they share one last embarrassing moment. Gloria and Cam share an emotional goodbye as he recites a poem to her, which she is not as upset by as he expected. Alex and Haley play one final prank on Luke, then share a heartwarming moment where they agree to always be there for each other as siblings. Joe humorously prepares Manny for his travels. Jay informs Gloria he is coming with her to Colombia and is learning Spanish. Luke and Manny share a final cousin/uncle love moment. Claire and Phil get emotional about the kids leaving and Phil tells her that they have to ‘leave the porch light on’ to ensure that they will always come back. They agree they will go on an RV road trip now that the kids have gone.

The family gather to finally say goodbye. They take a group selfie, hug, and then cannot let go. Phil tries to set an example and be the first to pull away, but immediately rushes back, claiming ‘It was awful’. The family cries as Haley explains how it is Mitch and Cam now, but eventually everyone will be separated. Jay says it is hard to say goodbye as ‘not everyone gets to have what [they] have’.

As Jay's speech plays over the end of the episode, it is shown that Haley and Dylan have moved into Mitch and Cam's old apartment. A montage is then played of mirrored images and references to the first episode, with Mitch and Cam on the plane eating cream puffs with their kids, Phil and Claire working on the calendar for their RV trip like they did to ‘shoot Luke’ in the pilot, and Jay and Gloria watching Joe play football like they did Manny, but this time neither of them can get out of their chairs to stand up. As Jay's speech ends the episode, saying that the comfort of your family is important and that ‘that's what helps [him] sleep at night’, the lights turn off in each respective house, but at the Dunphys’, the porch light is left on, signifying the family will always return.

In the ending credits, emotional music is heard as the camera pans through various photos of the 3 different families over the years. In the final shot, the camera focuses on the family portrait from the season one finale of all three families laughing together.

== Production ==
=== Development ===
The episode's titles were first announced on Instagram by Eric Stonestreet and Justin Mikita.

=== Casting ===
On March 26, 2020, it was confirmed that Elizabeth Banks would return as Sal and that Chris Geere would return as Arvin. It was also confirmed that Christian Barillas, Matthew Risch, Rory O'Malley, Rodrigo Rojas, and Charlie Trainer would appear as Ronaldo, Jotham, Ptolemy, Stefan, and Charlie, respectively.

== Critical reception ==
Many articles were published at the time of the show's ending citing it as the final version of the typical American sitcom of the 1980s to 2010s period, such as Cheers, Friends, and The Office. The Telegraph posted an article saying, "This isn't just the end of Modern Family – it's the end of the sitcom as we know it."

=== Ratings ===
The episode was watched live by 7.37 million viewers.

=== Reviews ===
The reviews for the episode were generally positive. Diane Gordon of TV Guide was extremely positive, stating that "Like most of its best episodes, the Modern Family Finale felt like a warm hug". She went on to say that "The genius of Modern Family is that it ended as it began: with the families growing and changing, while maintaining their close bonds and sense of humor. The show that felt like a warm hug each week closed out their run with a well-crafted episode that didn't feel like a permanent goodbye, but instead like a 'see ya later.' One can't help but think about where these families will be in five years. Let's hope we'll get to find out - it's sad to think this is the last time we'll see these lovable characters."

IndieWire gave the finale a C+, stating "What the Modern Family finale ultimately proves is what we’ve all known for years: The show should’ve ended years ago, when it was better equipped to tie together all these subplots, characters, and themes. Now, we’re left with an ending that doesn’t really want to be an ending. Maybe that’s enough (for) the casual family audience, but I have to believe modern viewers demand more."

The episode received a B+ grade from Kyle Fowle of The A.V. Club, who stated "there’s something that’s satisfying in just how low-key it is. The finale doesn’t necessarily shoot for outsized emotions. Instead, it makes things personal. It’s a finale that suits Modern Family as it is in 2020; a show that’s settled into old age... This is a finale that’s both tidy and unfinished, and that feels just right".
