= A Tale of Three Cities (Modern Family) =

- Modern Family episode
- Episode no.: Season 8 Episode 1
- Directed by: Chris Koch
- Written by: Elaine Ko
- Production code: 8ARG01
- Original air date: September 21, 2016

Guest appearances
- Stephanie Beatriz as Sonia Ramirez; Dana Powell as Pam Tucker; Celia Weston as Barb Tucker

Episode chronology
← Previous "Double Click"	Next → "A Stereotypical Day"
- Modern Family season 8

"A Tale of Three Cities" is the season premiere of the eighth season of the American sitcom Modern Family. It aired on September 21, 2016 on American Broadcasting Company (ABC). The premiere is directed by Chris Koch and written by Elaine Ko.

== Plot ==
Haley (Sarah Hyland), Alex (Ariel Winter) and Luke (Nolan Gould) are in vacation in New York with Claire (Julie Bowen) and Phil (Ty Burrell) but the parents leave early to go to a closet convention. At the last minute they decide to stay but, unbeknownst to them, the kids have made the same decision. Both groups try to hide from the other that they have stayed. Mitchell (Jesse Tyler Ferguson), Cameron (Eric Stonestreet) and Lily (Aubrey Anderson-Emmons) journey to Missouri. Cameron’s grandma dies and Mitchell aggravates the situation during the eulogy.

Jay (Ed O'Neill) and Gloria (Sofía Vergara) take Manny (Rico Rodriguez) and Joe (Jeremy Maguire) to a wedding in Juárez. While there they meet Sonia, Gloria's sister, whom Jay tells about Gloria's hot sauce business. After they return home, Sonia appears and kidnaps Manny in revenge for Gloria using their aunt's sauce recipe after previously preventing Sonia from starting a business herself because she was jealous of her for being her father's favorite.

The family reunites on Father’s Day and Gloria admits that Jay reminds her of her late father who strongly resembled him. The Dunphies all apologize to each other when they discover they all lied to each other regarding their extending holiday.

== Reception ==
Kyle Fowle of The A.V. Club gave the episode a C+.
