= Weathering Heights =

- Modern Family episode
- Episode no.: Season 8 Episode 4
- Directed by: Gail Mancuso
- Written by: Paul Corrigan; Brad Walsh
- Production code: 8ARG04
- Original air date: October 12, 2016

Guest appearance
- Nathan Fillion as Rainer Shine

Episode chronology
← Previous "Blindsided"	Next → "Halloween IV: Revenge of Rod Skyhook"
- Modern Family season 8

"Weathering Heights" is the fourth episode of the eighth season of the American sitcom Modern Family. It aired on October 12, 2016 on American Broadcasting Company (ABC). The episode is directed by Gail Mancuso and written by Paul Corrigan & Brad Walsh.

== Plot ==
Phil (Ty Burrell) is very excited when he is invited to appear on the local news for a segment on realtors. Claire (Julie Bowen) urges Haley (Sarah Hyland) to go with him, and she reluctantly accepts. He introduces her to Rainer Shine (Nathan Fillion), a meteorologist of whom Phil is a fan. Phil and Rainer become friends and while at a bar, Phil gives Rainer Haley’s phone number, thinking he needs a makeup-artist. He is less than thrilled to discover that this led to Rainer and Haley starting a romance. He is upset at first, but Phil manages to apologize to Haley and later reconciles with Rainer.

At the same time, Claire (Julie Bowen) and Luke (Nolan Gould) want to beat Alex (Ariel Winter) at Scrabble, whose mono is almost cured. Since Alex is sick, she has the impression that her intelligence decreased. Claire initially helps Luke cheat, but her conscience finally get the better of her and she admits her lie. As Alex’s behavior reverts to her old self, she finally falls asleep due to mono, and Claire advises Luke to shave her eyebrows.

Jay (Ed O'Neill) and Gloria (Sofía Vergara) learn that Manny (Rico Rodriguez) has to make an application video to go to college. Jay and Manny disagree about the video and finally Manny manages to make a heart warming presentation about himself, which makes Jay cry. Gloria takes Joe (Jeremy Maguire) to a speech therapist, which causes complications since Gloria has to speak “properly” in order to make Joe express his words without a lisp.

Mitchell (Jesse Tyler Ferguson) and Cameron (Eric Stonestreet) are so fond of Dwight that Lily (Aubrey Anderson-Emmons) becomes jealous. She tries to get him arrested, but is unsuccessful. Her dads manage to reassure her, and they end the episode playing with dolls and tea along with Dwight.

== Reception ==
Kyle Fowle of The A.V. Club gave the episode a B.
