= Grab It =

Grab It may refer to:

- Grab-it, or Grab It, a brand of cookware
- Grab It (Modern Family), an episode of the TV series Modern Family
- Grab It Here, a former chain of cash-and-carry stores
