= Modern Family season 11 =

Season of television series

Modern Family
- Season 11
- Home media cover art
- Starring: Ed O'Neill; Sofía Vergara; Julie Bowen; Ty Burrell; Jesse Tyler Ferguson; Eric Stonestreet; Sarah Hyland; Ariel Winter; Nolan Gould; Rico Rodriguez; Aubrey Anderson-Emmons; Jeremy Maguire; Reid Ewing
- No. of episodes: 18

Release
- Original network: ABC
- Original release: September 25, 2019 – April 8, 2020

Season chronology
- ← Previous; Season 10

The eleventh and final season of the American television sitcom Modern Family aired on ABC from September 25, 2019 to April 8, 2020.

This season was ordered on January 7, 2019. The season was produced by 20th Century Fox Television, Steven Levitan Productions, and Picador Productions, with creators Steven Levitan and Christopher Lloyd as showrunners.

== Cast ==
=== Main ===
- Ed O'Neill as Jay Pritchett
- Sofía Vergara as Gloria Pritchett
- Julie Bowen as Claire Dunphy
- Ty Burrell as Phil Dunphy
- Jesse Tyler Ferguson as Mitchell Pritchett
- Eric Stonestreet as Cameron Tucker
- Sarah Hyland as Haley Dunphy
- Ariel Winter as Alex Dunphy
- Nolan Gould as Luke Dunphy
- Rico Rodriguez as Manny Delgado
- Aubrey Anderson-Emmons as Lily Tucker-Pritchett
- Jeremy Maguire as Joe Pritchett
- Reid Ewing as Dylan Marshall

=== Recurring ===
- Marsha Kramer as Margaret

=== Notable guests ===
- Hillary Anne Matthews as Sherry Shaker
- Kristen Li as Suzie
- Tara Strong as Bridget the Smart Fridge (voice)
- Gabrielle Ruiz as Anne
- Amy Pietz as Janice
- Molly Ephraim as Libby
- Stephanie Beatriz as Sonia Ramirez
- Stephanie Koenig as Sheryl
- Christopher Gorham as Brad
- Matthew Wilkas as Paul
- Dominic Burgess as Nate
- Rob Riggle as Gil Thorpe
- Kevin Daniels as Longines
- Sam Lloyd as Bobby
- Daniela Bobadilla as Trish
- Jimmy Tatro as Bill
- Andy Walken as Deadpool
- Alex Perez as Waiter
- Mather Zickel as Scooter
- Rory O'Malley as Ptolemy
- Ed Begley Jr. as Jerry
- Rachel Bay Jones as Farrah Marshall
- Lauren Adams as Campbell
- Jen Kirkman as Molly
- Courteney Cox as herself
- David Beckham as himself
- Stephen Merchant as Higgins
- Snoop Dogg as himself (voice)
- Mark Saul as Mantel
- Michelle Campbell as aerobic woman
- Fred Willard as Frank Dunphy
- Paula Marshall as Beverly
- Hayley Erin as Brenda Feldman
- Melissa Greenspan as Debra
- Benjamin Bratt as Javier Delgado
- Josh Gad as Kenneth
- Paul Dooley as Murray
- Edward Asner as Herschel
- Arnaud Binard as Guy
- Morgan Murphy as Waitress
- Chris Geere as Arvin Fennerman
- Wendie Malick as Miss Beckman
- Jon Daly as Doug
- Tom Fitzpatrick as Jim
- Elizabeth Banks as Sal
- Rusty Gatenby as Jim Alvarez

== Episodes ==
Modern Family season 11 episodes
No. overall	No. in season	Title	Directed by	Written by	Original release date	Prod. code	U.S. viewers (millions)
233	1	"New Kids on the Block"	Gail Mancuso	Paul Corrigan & Brad Walsh	September 25, 2019	BARG01	4.09
Alex is doing research in Antarctica to better understand what happens there. Haley and Dylan try to get their twins Poppy and George off to sleep, with the help of Claire and Phil. Haley reads a book on what to do in sticky situations with her babies and tries to reinforce what she learned to her parents, but Claire and Phil have another way of putting them to sleep. Jay, Gloria and Manny make a dog bed commercial for Jay's dog bed business using their dog Stella. Portraying Stella's voice is Manny's ex-girlfriend, Sherry. As the director, and using Gloria's advice, Manny tries to win back Sherry's love. Cameron tells Mitchell that he invited his theatre students over to "bond" with them. Actually, they were there to get Mitchell to admit that he threw out Cam's beloved clown statue.
234	2	"Snapped"	Michael Spiller	Elaine Ko	October 2, 2019	BARG02	4.32
Cameron buys a voice-assisted refrigerator named Bridget and both Mitchell and Cam separately form a bond with the refrigerator. Phil teaches a real estate course that Gloria attends; she and her rival classmate, Libby, have the opportunity to be Phil's intern. Libby is involved in a cycling accident and has to go to the hospital and Phil suspects Gloria of deliberately crashing into Libby, but the cycling accident was actually caused by Phil's juggling in the college parking lot and Libby's losing her concentration and crashing into Gloria's parked car. Claire has reporters come over to her house for a magazine interview and photoshoot and tries to get everyone out of the house by pretending to be sick because she does not want her family to be included in the interview. Alex returns from Antarctica and with Haley and Luke, discover why Claire was lying about being sick.
235	3	"Perfect Pairs"	Iwona Sapienza	Stephen Lloyd	October 9, 2019	BARG04	3.95
Phil, Claire, Alex and Luke exploit Haley's twins to their own advantage: Phil has a magic competition and uses the twins to make a better impression than he did the previous year; Claire uses the twins to impress a prospective client in order to sell her a closet; and Luke uses the babies to buy wine for a girl. Later, Haley and Dylan find out what happened because of the camera in their baby carriage. Gloria, while not listening to Jay and Manny, and without consulting her sister Sonia, suspects that Sonia's boyfriend and soon-to-be husband is gold-digging her. Mitchell and Cameron rent their vacant apartment to an impossibly perfect gay couple.
236	4	"Pool Party"	Abraham Higginbotham	Abraham Higginbotham & Jon Pollack	October 16, 2019	BARG03	4.21
Mitchell and Cameron convince Lily to be herself and wear a bathing suit at a pool party. As Lily starts to enjoy the party, Mitch and Cam go and hide because they are embarrassed by their less-than-perfect physiques. They later stand up and show Lily that everyone should be proud of themselves. Phil and Gloria try to sell a house, but someone keeps stealing the For Sale sign, so Gloria takes Stella's tracking band to find the culprit. Jay is irritated that Gloria is never home because of her job, and when she is home, she doesn't listen to him anyway, which makes him angrier. Claire tries to convince Haley that she should go back to work. She also tries to convince Alex that she should take a corporate job offer. Meanwhile, Claire has new problems at work, witnessed by Haley and Alex.
237	5	"The Last Halloween"	Fred Savage	Danny Zuker	October 30, 2019	BARG06	3.93
It's Halloween again, and Phil tries to scare Claire because she says that she can't be frightened. He brings her to a scary movie, which frightens him instead of her. Later, Phil scares Claire with a plan 11 months in the making, creating a war with Claire. Jay wants to save a rare Fudgy Duddy candy bar for when Joe comes home from trick-or-treating, but Jay is soon on the hunt when Manny accidentally gives out the chocolate bar to a trick-or-treater. Gloria is concerned that she getting old when other people correctly identify her as Jay's wife. Alex and Luke go on dinner dates at the same restaurant with their respective lovers Bill and Janice. However, when it is revealed that Alex accidentally sent intimate pictures to Bill's friend, and that Luke had once pulled a harmful prank at Janice's home, the lovers walk out on the disappointed siblings, who wind up eating dinner together.
238	6	"A Game of Chicken"	Helena Lamb-Weber	Vali Chandrasekaran	November 6, 2019	BARG05	3.95
Claire is stressed out about work and no longer enjoys her job. Luke asks his parents for permission to drop out of college so that he can work on an app with his new business partner Scott. Phil supports Luke until he finds out that Luke did not come to him first. Later, Claire quits her job and both Phil and Claire agree to support Luke's decision. Meanwhile, Gloria tries to secretly baptize Poppy and George at home so that they will be protected in the afterlife. Jay thinks that she is wrong and that the babies' parents should decide. When Haley and Dylan discover Gloria's plan, they decide that they will think about it and perhaps have a church christening in the future. Cameron upsets Mitch when he considers taking a college football coaching job in his home state of Missouri without first consulting Mitch. At a football game with the college recruiter watching, Cam is distracted by his team's dolphin mascot, who persists in mocking him, so Mitch tries to help Cam out.
239	7	"The Last Thanksgiving"	Eric Dean Seaton	Jeffrey Richman	November 20, 2019	BARG10	3.95
Haley wants to prepare Thanksgiving dinner for her parents as a gesture of gratitude and enlists the help of Alex and Luke. Alex asks her chef ex-boyfriend to help them cook, but he is too overpowering and is later kicked out by Phil, so Claire ends up in charge again and thanks Haley for her efforts. Jay, Phil and Dylan fly Jay's model airplane, but Phil gets jealous when Jay trusts Dylan with the airplane. Phil later finds out that Jay purposely flew the plane at him ten years earlier; he then accidentally flies the airplane into himself. Claire is tricked by Gloria to do her housework, and later tells Jay that she is restless since quitting her job and misses being the boss. When Cameron and Mitchell go food shopping for Thanksgiving, they divide the shopping list to save time, but when Mitch tells Ronaldo that he and Cam have "split up," the misunderstanding goes viral and to Mitch's bewilderment their friends sympathize with Cam and not with him.
240	8	"Tree's a Crowd"	Julie Bowen	Ryan Walls	December 4, 2019	BARG07	3.82
Dylan's mother Farrah visits Phil and Claire's home to see the twins, but Phil and Claire don't want her staying long. Claire's stepdad Jerry also wants to pay a visit, so Phil and Claire think that if Jerry and Farrah meet, they can leave together, but when Jerry discovers DeDe's ashes/tree in Claire's backyard, he is overcome with emotion. Manny is feeling sad over his breakup with Sherry, so Gloria asks Luke to go to Sherry's improv show to put in a good word about Manny, but Luke later tells Gloria and Jay that he kissed Sherry at the show. When Luke confesses to Manny, Manny is furious and tries to attack him. Jay calms Manny and asks Luke to leave. Meanwhile, Mitchell and Cameron are asked to donate their sperm to a lesbian couple wishing to start a family, but decide that they will not donate; as it turns out, the couple has already selected a different donor.
241	9	"The Last Christmas"	Jeff Walker	Abraham Higginbotham & Jon Pollack	December 11, 2019	BARG09	4.27
The families gather for Christmas dinner at Mitchell and Cameron's house. Cam has a seating plan but for various reasons nobody wants to sit in their assigned seat: Gloria doesn't want to sit next to Phil because she interviewed with another realty company; Claire does not want to sit with her father because she knows he'll ask her to work at his dog bed company; Haley and Mitchell discover that Cam has a hidden first class ticket to Missouri; Luke's new relationship with Sherry is exposed, causing more conflict. During grace, the family cannot stop sniping at one another, so Cam reveals that it may be their last Christmas together since he is job interviewing at an out-of-state college. Everyone mentions their own future possibilities, leading to apologies and reconciliation. Later, they pose in matching pajamas for a family Christmas picture.
242	10	"The Prescott"	Elaine Ko	Elaine Ko	January 8, 2020	BARG08	6.39
Alex's new job lodges her at the opulent Prescott residential complex; the luxurious amenities interest her family, who memorize her resident ID code to later re-enter the premises. Although Alex explains that the Prescott has a strict "no unaccompanied guest" policy, each family member uses the ID code to sneak back in: Jay wants to watch his Blu-ray copy of Lawrence of Arabia in their deluxe screening room; Gloria wants to try their water slide; Claire wants to visit their high-end hair salon; Phil wants to sample their gourmet hamburger slider; Mitch and Cam want to meet celebrities; and Luke and Manny want to meet older ladies at their gym. After various misadventures all parties meet up at the rooftop hot tubs. Their sneaky acts are revealed to Alex when she receives a hefty bill for their activities.
243	11	"Legacy"	Jason Z. Kemp	Jack Burditt & Christopher Lloyd	January 15, 2020	BARG12	3.84
Phil visits his father Frank in Florida after hearing he was found wandering around his old grocery store, possibly suffering from dementia; the two have one last great day together before Frank passes away from old age. Jay invites Claire and Mitchell to retrieve old belongings from the garage, which gets them wondering why a vacation from their childhood was cut short (Jay needed to work extra hours to pay his employees). Jay uses Joe to help sell dog beds but later realizes his product idea is a flop. Manny once again tries to impress the girl at the mall that he originally wanted ten years ago, but is stopped before making an embarrassing "grand gesture." Cam and Gloria help each other with work rivals.
244	12	"Dead on a Rival"	Jason Winer	Jeffrey Richman & Ryan Walls	January 22, 2020	BARG13	3.50
Alex is looking for a new assistant for her job. Jay recommends Margaret, his long-time assistant, to Alex. Alex hires her but doesn't like her performance. Alex ends up firing Margaret, who admits that she wants to retire, but she does not want Jay to feel abandoned. Phil's old neighbor, a wealthy tech titan, comes to visit and asks if he would like to go to space with him. Javier attends Manny's one-man show and invites him on a year-long around-the-world cruise. Jay agrees with Javier that Manny should go out and enjoy life, but Gloria is worried that Javier will be a bad influence on Manny. After seeing Manny's show and understanding the effects of her coddling Manny, Gloria agrees that Manny should go out and enjoy life with Javier. Mitchell and Cameron are about to go to a flash sale when the previous owner of their house comes over unexpectedly and announces that he wants to die in his old house. Mitch and Cam try to encourage him not to give up on life by saying that there is a lot more to experience. The old owner visits his former friend who still lives in the neighborhood, and the two get into an argument.
245	13	"Paris"	James Bagdonas	Paul Corrigan & Brad Walsh	February 12, 2020	BARG11	3.73
Jay and his family fly to Paris because Jay was told by Manny that he was receiving an award for his closet business at an international expo. Unfortunately, in reality Jay didn't win but rather was supposed to claim the award on behalf of Earl (a misunderstanding resulting from Manny's limited ability to understand French). Gloria and Manny try to keep the news from Jay, but he finds out. Claire assures Jay that his family is proud of him, award or not. Phil surprises Claire by showing up in Paris after claiming to have a work conflict, but he is surprised by Guy, a man Claire promised to meet up with in Paris after they dated while she studied abroad in Paris 30 years ago. Phil is jealous of Guy's past relationship with Claire, but ends up hitting it off with Guy after finding out they share an interest in magic and robots -- which makes Claire jealous. Mitchell tries to pass himself off as a Frenchman with a new wardrobe and attitude. Cam performs as Fizbo in the streets of Paris but has a run-in with another "Fizbeau".
246	14	"Spuds"	Beth McCarthy-Miller	Vali Chandrasekaran & Stephen Lloyd	February 19, 2020	BARG14	3.28
Phil and Claire take Haley and Dylan to dinner to reassure them they are not bad parents. While out to dinner, they run into Mitch and Cam who are chaperoning Lily's first date, as well as Jay and Gloria after attending Joe's school play.
247	15	"Baby Steps"	Trey Clinesmith	Story by : Abraham Higginbotham & Jon Pollack; Teleplay by : Steven Levitan & Morgan Murphy	March 18, 2020	BARG15	4.33
Claire prepares for her online interview for an organization job. Meanwhile, Phil calls Jay to fix the broken step that Luke hurt himself on. Claire walks up the stairs and gets her leg stuck through the step. Jay and Phil try to bring her organization shelf to Claire to boost up her confidence during the interview. The interview goes wrong and Claire decides to talk about how she really feels about the job, which she ends up getting. Alex attends the Caltech event. Haley needs an experienced scientist for Nerp so she goes to the event. Arvin's students start telling Alex that her company has horrible ideas with technology. Alex and Haley meet up with Arvin, who explains that Alex would be “perfect” for his new technology idea. Mitchell and Cameron try and decide on what to do about the adoption agency. They decide to ask Gloria for some advice. Gloria is too focused on her open house to help Mitch and Cam. Gloria ends up giving Mitch and Cam a tour of the house, and they spontaneously decide to buy it and adopt the baby.
248	16	"I'm Going to Miss This"	Fred Savage	Jack Burditt & Danny Zuker	April 1, 2020	BARG16	4.33
Mitch, Cam and Lily move into their new house, but Mitch struggles to adjust. Gloria encourages him to literally say goodbye to the old house. Mitch and Cam's anxieties return when they learn that their new baby has been born early, before Lily helps them realise that they are ready to welcome their son. Haley, Alex and Luke frantically attempt to clean up after a party at the Dunphy house, without Claire and Phil finding out. During their Easter party, Phil and Claire struggle with their new identity as grandparents but eventually realise their parenting skills are still needed. Jay and Manny debate on who has a better passion for wine.
249	17	"Finale"	Steven Levitan	Steven Levitan & Abraham Higginbotham & Jeffrey Richman & Stephen Lloyd & Jon Pollack & Morgan Murphy & Ryan Walls	April 8, 2020	BARG17	7.37
250	18	"Finale"	Gail Mancuso	Christopher Lloyd & Paul Corrigan & Brad Walsh & Danny Zuker & Elaine Ko & Vali Chandrasekaran & Jack Burditt	April 8, 2020	BARG18	7.37
Phil and Claire decide that they want one of their kids to move out because the house has too many people living in it, and Phil and Claire have been living in the RV, which they do not like. Mitch and Cam name their son Rexford, after the street the house is on. Cam receives the job offer that he wanted in Missouri. He sees how Mitch has been enjoying the new house and the baby, which means it would be harder to tell him. Cam eventually tells him in front of his family and friends at their housewarming party. Mitch, being put on the spot, agreed to support Cam and move. Just as Phil and Claire are about to tell the kids the news, they learn that Haley, Dylan, and the twins are moving into Mitch and Cam's old home, Alex's job has been relocated to Switzerland, and Luke has been accepted to the University of Oregon. Gloria notices Jay in several moments of self-isolation, leading her to worry about him. It is revealed that he is trying to learn Spanish to impress her and so he would be able to go to Colombia with her and Joe over the summer. As the family gets together to say farewell to Mitch, Cam, Lily, and Rexford, the flight is repeatedly delayed. During this time, Claire and Mitch steal their figure skating trophy which Jay and DeDe donated to the figure skating association because Claire and Mitch were fighting over who should keep it. Cam gives Gloria his letter and tells her to express her feelings on a card, which she thought was directed at Manny, who is leaving to travel the world with his father Javier. Haley and Alex seek to prank Luke one last time by refilming a video that they made when they were young. Haley and Alex wanted to prove that they were able to take care of a dog, with Luke as the dog. Before everyone parts ways, the family meets up at Phil and Claire's house and they form a big family hug. The episode ends with a voiceover of Jay featuring all three houses as the lights turn off, yet at the Dunphys' the porch light is turned back on.

== Special ==
A retrospective special entitled A Modern Farewell aired on Wednesday, April 8, 2020 at 8:00 P.M., prior to the series finale. The retrospective included appearances by Ed O'Neill, Sofia Vergara, Ty Burrell, Julie Bowen, Jesse Tyler Ferguson, Eric Stonestreet, Sarah Hyland, Ariel Winter, Nolan Gould, Rico Rodriguez, Aubrey Anderson-Emmons, Jeremy Maguire, Reid Ewing and Benjamin Bratt.

== Ratings ==
Viewership and ratings per episode of Modern Family season 11
No.	Title	Air date	Rating/share (18–49)	Viewers (millions)	DVR (18–49)	DVR viewers (millions)	Total (18–49)	Total viewers (millions)
1	"New Kids on the Block"	September 25, 2019	1.1/5	4.09	1.1	3.14	2.2	7.25
2	"Snapped"	October 2, 2019	1.1/6	4.32	1.0	2.57	2.1	6.89
3	"Perfect Pairs"	October 9, 2019	0.9/5	3.95	0.9	2.54	1.8	6.50
4	"Pool Party"	October 16, 2019	1.0/5	4.21	0.9	2.44	1.9	6.65
5	"The Last Halloween"	October 30, 2019	1.0/4	3.93	1.0	2.77	2.0	6.70
6	"A Game of Chicken"	November 6, 2019	0.9/5	3.95	0.9	2.57	1.8	6.52
7	"The Last Thanksgiving"	November 20, 2019	0.9/5	3.95	0.9	2.69	1.8	6.64
8	"Tree's a Crowd"	December 4, 2019	0.9/5	3.82	0.8	2.48	1.7	6.31
9	"The Last Christmas"	December 11, 2019	0.9/5	4.27	0.8	2.38	1.7	6.65
10	"The Prescott"	January 8, 2020	1.5/8	6.39	0.8	2.46	2.3	8.86
11	"Legacy"	January 15, 2020	0.9/5	3.84	0.9	2.70	1.8	6.54
12	"Dead on a Rival"	January 22, 2020	0.8/4	3.50	0.8	2.68	1.6	6.19
13	"Paris"	February 12, 2020	0.9	3.73	0.7	2.42	1.6	6.15
14	"Spuds"	February 19, 2020	0.7	3.28	0.8	2.53	1.5	5.82
15	"Baby Steps"	March 18, 2020	0.9	4.33	0.8	2.49	1.7	6.81
16	"I'm Going to Miss This"	April 1, 2020	1.0	4.33	0.8	2.74	1.8	7.07
17	"Finale Part 1"	April 8, 2020	1.6	7.37	0.7	2.80	2.3	10.17
18	"Finale Part 2"	April 8, 2020	1.6	7.37	0.7	2.80	2.3	10.17

== DVD release ==
The Eleventh and Final Season of Modern Family was released on DVD in a three-disc set on June 9, 2020, for Region 1. The box set only contains the final 18 episodes of the series as no special features were included with the release. This was also one of the last physical releases made by 20th Century Home Entertainment under the name they used from 1995 to 2020, as the company was acquired by Disney in January 2020 and was then renamed to 20th. Century Home Entertainment. This is also the first and only season of the series to be distributed worldwide by Buena Vista Home Entertainment. The season was also released on Digital HD following the series' conclusion on April 9, 2020.

Modern Family: The Complete Eleventh and Final Season
Set Details
18 Episodes; 3 Disc Set; English & Spanish 5.1 Dolby Digital, French 2.0 Surround; Subtitles: English SDH, Spanish, French; Runtime: 386 Minutes; No special features included
Release Dates
Region 1	Region 2	Region 4
June 9, 2020	February 17, 2021	March 31, 2021
