= Modern Family season 8 =

Season of television series

Modern Family
- Season 8
- DVD cover
- Starring: Ed O'Neill; Sofía Vergara; Julie Bowen; Ty Burrell; Jesse Tyler Ferguson; Eric Stonestreet; Sarah Hyland; Ariel Winter; Nolan Gould; Rico Rodriguez; Aubrey Anderson-Emmons; Jeremy Maguire
- No. of episodes: 22

Release
- Original network: ABC
- Original release: September 21, 2016 – May 17, 2017

Season chronology
- ← Previous; Season 7 Next → Season 9

The eighth season of the American television sitcom Modern Family aired on ABC from September 21, 2016 to May 17, 2017.

This season was ordered on March 3, 2016. The season is produced by Steven Levitan Productions and Picador Productions in association with 20th Century Fox Television, with creators Steven Levitan and Christopher Lloyd as showrunners.

== Cast ==
=== Main cast ===
- Ed O'Neill as Jay Pritchett
- Sofía Vergara as Gloria Pritchett
- Julie Bowen as Claire Dunphy
- Ty Burrell as Phil Dunphy
- Jesse Tyler Ferguson as Mitchell Pritchett
- Eric Stonestreet as Cameron Tucker
- Sarah Hyland as Haley Dunphy
- Ariel Winter as Alex Dunphy
- Nolan Gould as Luke Dunphy
- Rico Rodriguez as Manny Delgado
- Aubrey Anderson-Emmons as Lily Tucker-Pritchett
- Jeremy Maguire as Joe Pritchett

=== Recurring cast ===
- Fred Willard as Frank Dunphy
- Winston Duke as Dwight
- Nathan Fillion as Rainer Shine
- Brianna Askins as April Shine
- Joe Mande as Ben
- Dana Powell as Pam Tucker

=== Guest cast ===
- Stephanie Beatriz as Sonia Ramirez
- Celia Weston as Barb Tucker
- Ernie Hudson as Miles
- Christian Barillas as Ronaldo
- Martin Short as Merv Schechter
- Andy Daly as Principal Brown
- Robert Costanzo as Earl Chambers
- Joely Fisher as Maggie Braithwaite
- Kelsey Grammer as Keifth
- Shelley Long as DeDe Pritchett
- Elizabeth Banks as Sal
- Peyton Manning as Coach Gary
- Victor Garber as Chef Dumont
- Rob Riggle as Gil Thorpe
- Jane Krakowski as Dr. Donna Duncan
- Charles Barkley as himself
- DeAndre Jordan as himself
- Faith Prince as Lorraine
- Niecy Nash as Joan
- Reid Ewing as Dylan Marshall
- Benjamin Bratt as Javier Delgado
- Lindsey Kraft as Joey
- Jackie Seiden as Dr. Elaine Kolchek
- Sedona Fuller as Betty Kolchek
- London Fuller as Janice Kolchek
- Nakia Seacrest as Vice Principal

== Production ==
Modern Family was renewed for an eighth season on March 3, 2016, with several other ABC shows. Sofia Vergara shared a photo on Instagram of the cast doing a photo-shoot for the eighth season on July 26, 2016. The table read for the season occurred the same day, with filming beginning shortly after. The Hollywood Reporter announced on August 4, 2016, that Castle-alum Nathan Fillion had been cast in a recurring role of three episodes as the weatherman Rainer Shine. It was also announced that Martin Short will appear in a guest role in the third episode of the season as a promotional maven. A promotional poster was released on August 23, 2016. On September 26, 2016, Variety reported that Modern Family would feature the first openly transgender child actor on network-television. The 8-year old actor Jackson Millarker appeared in the second episode of the season as Lily's playmate Tom. "The Hollywood Reporter" reported on November 7, 2016, that Peyton Manning will guest star in the 12th episode of the season. "Manning will play Coach Gary, baby Joe's sports tutor, whom Gloria (Sofia Vergara) brings in to help teach Joe how to throw and catch. When Coach Gary also starts doing things around the house, Jay (Ed O'Neill) is left feeling a bit emasculated." Kelsey Grammer guest-starred in a January 2017 episode of the series, portraying Cam's ex-boyfriend Keifth. The Hollywood Reporter reported that NBA stars Charles Barkley and DeAndre Jordan will guest-star in a late January 2017 episode, playing themselves. The source stated "For their part in the show, Barkley and Jordan will be attending a charity basketball game that Phil (Ty Burrell) has been training all year for in an attempt to redeem himself after a disastrous turn at the previous year's game. When they both start getting a little too involved, Phil tries to not buckle under the pressure."

== Episodes ==
No. overall	No. in season	Title	Directed by	Written by	Original release date	Prod. code	U.S. viewers (millions)
167	1	"A Tale of Three Cities"	Chris Koch	Elaine Ko	September 21, 2016	8ARG01	8.24
In New York, the Dunphy family decides to stay a few days longer, with the parents and the kids each lying to the other about prolonging the vacation. In Missouri, Mitchell faces some discontent from Cam's family due to his treatment of Cam's comatose grandma. In Mexico, Gloria clashes with her sister over the hot sauce business, leading to Sonia kidnapping Manny.
168	2	"A Stereotypical Day"	Ryan Case	Vali Chandrasekaran	September 28, 2016	8ARG03	7.41
A Black family moves in across the street on the same day Jay happens to be installing new security cameras, leading Jay to go to extreme measures to ensure he is not seen as a racist. Meanwhile, the Dunphy family takes advantage of Alex when she becomes sick, which leads to her skipping a semester at Caltech. Mitchell and Cameron reevaluate their views of each other as open, non-judgmental, supportive parents when Lily calls an openly transgender boy a weirdo.
169	3	"Blindsided"	Jim Hensz	Christy Stratton & Danny Zuker	October 5, 2016	8ARG02	6.97
Luke decides to run against Manny for student council president. Claire becomes his manager while Jay and Gloria help Manny. Now that Haley wants to create her own company, Phil introduces her to an eccentric marketing expert, while Cameron decides to house his star football player without consulting Mitchell.
170	4	"Weathering Heights"	Gail Mancuso	Paul Corrigan & Brad Walsh	October 12, 2016	8ARG04	7.50
Phil gets to meet his weatherman hero (Nathan Fillion) when he is on the local news in a real estate segment, but later regrets the decision to introduce him to Haley. Meanwhile, Jay tries to help with Manny's video application to Juilliard and Lily tries to get rid of Cam's football player who's living with them.
171	5	"Halloween IV: Revenge of Rod Skyhook"	Chris Koch	Stephen Lloyd	October 26, 2016	8ARG06	7.38
Luke's Halloween party isn't the monster bash he dreamed it would be and is at risk of being the worst party of the year. Sensing trouble, the rest of the Dunphys realize all his party needs is a visit from Rod Skyhook, a little promotion, and some adult supervision to get it started. Meanwhile, Cam faces off with his Halloween nemesis and, when Jay finds out that Manny is going to a party at the home of an old enemy, he enlists him in his revenge scheme.
172	6	"Grab It"	Beth McCarthy-Miller	Jeffrey Richman	November 9, 2016	8ARG05	7.23
Jay's country club, his favorite place in the world and only refuge, may be losing some of its charm when Phil considers becoming a member. At the Dunphy house, Claire mistakes her influence on Alex's life choices, and Gloria seeks refuge from her sons. Meanwhile, when Cam doesn't give Mitchell the full story on what his play is really about, it really puts Mitchell in the spotlight.
173	7	"Thanksgiving Jamboree"	Steven Levitan	Jon Pollack & Chuck Tatham	November 16, 2016	8ARG08	7.33
Cameron spares no expense for his Thanksgiving jamboree; Haley tells Phil she'd rather spend the holiday with her new boyfriend; Jay works to keep his blood pressure down; Alex and Dwight get closer.
174	8	"The Alliance"	James Bagdonas	Andy Gordon & Ryan Walls	November 30, 2016	8ARG09	6.81
Phil, Cam, and Gloria have a secret meeting, while Luke helps Jay at his club and Haley chaperones Rainer's daughter.
175	9	"Snow Ball"	Beth McCarthy-Miller	Christy Stratton & Stephen Lloyd	December 14, 2016	8ARG10	6.81
Luke and Manny are in charge of the winter dance, Claire and Gloria want to mellow out a PTA mom, Phil tries to spend time with Jay, and Mitch confronts a bully.
176	10	"Ringmaster Keifth"	Jim Hensz	Vali Chandrasekaran	January 4, 2017	8ARG11	7.57
Cameron reunites with his ex-boyfriend, a former ringmaster turned concierge played by Kelsey Grammer. Phil learns that his father is dating his childhood babysitter and Jay and Gloria decide on a guardian for Joe.
177	11	"Sarge & Pea"	James Bagdonas	Abraham Higginbotham	January 11, 2017	8ARG07	7.59
Cam is helped by his nieces in seeking revenge against a mother who, according to him, deprived him of a beautiful moment at Lily's dance recital. Phil and Gloria have different visions for Luke and Manny's future college lives. Mitch, Claire, and Jay meet Dede at a relative's wedding.
178	12	"Do You Believe in Magic"	Gail Mancuso	Jon Pollack	February 8, 2017	8ARG15	7.34
Claire decides to hire a magician to help her bring Phil some wonder on Valentine's Day. Cam and Mitch encourage Haley and Sal (Elizabeth Banks) to stand-up to their men with unexpected results. Jay discovers his habit of showing preferential treatment to Joe over Manny has its limits and Alex finds out that Ben, Claire's assistant, has a crush on her.
179	13	"Do It Yourself"	Jeffrey Walker	Paul Corrigan & Brad Walsh	February 15, 2017	8ARG12	6.92
Jay is talked into investing in a property with Phil and also has to deal with Gloria's hiring of Joe's handyman baseball coach (Peyton Manning) who seems like he's gunning to replace him. Claire and Haley go to a culinary lesson given by a big chef (Victor Garber). Mitch and Cam try to teach Lily about hard work, resulting in a wasp attack and a disfigured face for Cam.
180	14	"Heavy Is the Head"	Ken Whittingham	Danny Zuker	February 22, 2017	8ARG14	6.65
Phil has to rethink his plans when his investment goes wrong. Gloria tries to surprise Claire with an amazing birthday, but Claire's announcement of cutbacks at work doesn't mix well with Gloria's fancy pampering. Cameron, still haunted by a traumatic childhood incident, refuses to have an MRI.
181	15	"Finding Fizbo"	James Bagdonas	Abraham Higginbotham & Chuck Tatham	March 1, 2017	8ARG16	6.41
Phil plans Frank's bachelor party and meets his soon-to-be step-brother. Manny asks Haley, Gloria, Alex, and Claire to tell him what they honestly think of his play, while Alex wants to bail to meet with Ben. Cam discovers what happened to his Fizbo costume.
182	16	"Basketball"	Jim Hensz	Elaine Ko	March 8, 2017	8ARG13	6.49
Phil volunteers to play in a charity basketball game in order to redeem himself after the previous year's event turned disastrous. Two NBA players, Charles Barkley and DeAndre Jordan, also attend, putting him under pressure. Also, Claire has a big secret to hide from Jay, who fears Joe doesn't respect his authority. Gloria and Donna Duncan's rivalry returns with interesting results. Mitch and Cam give Haley advice for her relationship with Rainer.
183	17	"Pig Moon Rising"	Chris Koch	Paul Corrigan & Brad Walsh	March 15, 2017	8ARG17	6.12
Mitchell accidentally knocks over Cam's pig's ashes and devises a cover-up in order to avoid telling him. Secrets drive everyone to an elaborate web of quid pro quo.
184	18	"Five Minutes"	Gail Mancuso	Elaine Ko	March 29, 2017	8ARG18	6.79
A look at 300 seconds in the lives of the Pritchett-Dunphy-Tucker clan includes Mitch and Cam hurrying to catch a flight for which they prematurely took sleeping pills, Haley and Rainer reevaluating their relationship at dinner before his birthday cake arrives, Phil and Claire meeting Alex's new boyfriend, and Manny trying to find a parking spot at the movies while Jay and Gloria argue.
185	19	"Frank's Wedding"	Beth McCarthy-Miller	Andy Gordon	April 5, 2017	8ARG19	6.25
Frank Dunphy's wedding has a Roaring '20s theme, so Phil gets his family to show up in costume, but Claire and the kids realize it's time for an intervention with Phil when they're the only ones dressed up. Meanwhile, Jay comes to regret mastering the art of saying "no" and Cam finally gets the courage to stand up to his sister Pam, albeit causing Pam to go into labour with a baby boy.
186	20	"All Things Being Equal"	Michelle MacLaren	Christy Stratton & Ryan Walls	May 3, 2017	8ARG20	5.65
Gloria, Claire, Haley, Alex, Lily, Luke, and Manny show support for gender equality and the women's movement in their own ways; Jay and Phil butt heads over their parking attendant; Cam feels jealous when Pam prefers Mitchell's help with the baby over his.
187	21	"Alone Time"	Jim Hensz	Abraham Higginbotham & Stephen Lloyd & Danny Zuker	May 10, 2017	8ARG21	5.71
Phil and Claire have difficulties adapting now that their kids have supposedly left the nest. Jay and Mitch go to the same retreat, while Cam helps Gloria get over an illness.
188	22	"The Graduates"	Steven Levitan	Jon Pollack & Jeffrey Richman & Chuck Tatham	May 17, 2017	8ARG22	6.20
The whole family gets ready for Luke and Manny's graduation day. Javier picks up his son and takes him to a strip club. Phil and Claire have to deal with the fact that Luke has grown up and Mitch and Cam learn that Lily might be precocious.

== Ratings ==
Viewership and ratings per episode of Modern Family season 8
No.	Title	Air date	Rating/share (18–49)	Viewers (millions)	DVR (18–49)	DVR viewers (millions)	Total (18–49)	Total viewers (millions)
1	"A Tale of Three Cities"	September 21, 2016	2.6/9 (9)	8.24 (24)	1.7	4.12	4.3	12.35 (+65%)
2	"A Stereotypical Day"	September 28, 2016	2.3/8 (14)	7.41	1.7	4.15	4.0	11.56 (+74%)
3	"Blindsided"	October 5, 2016	2.2/8 (12)	6.97 (24)	1.6	3.78	3.8	10.75 (+73%)
4	"Weathering Heights"	October 12, 2016	2.4/8 (12)	7.50 (25)	1.6	3.90	4.0	11.40 (+67%)
5	"Halloween 4: The Revenge of Rod Skyhook"	October 26, 2016	2.3/7 (13)	7.38	1.8	4.20	4.1	11.58 (+78%)
6	"Grab It"	November 9, 2016	2.3/8 (12)	7.23 (23)	1.6	3.87	3.9	11.10 (+70%)
7	"Thanksgiving Jamboree"	November 16, 2016	2.2/8 (12)	7.33	1.6	4.08	3.8	11.41 (+73%)
8	"The Alliance"	November 30, 2016	2.2/8 (12)	6.81	1.6	3.89	3.8	10.70 (+73%)
9	"Snow Ball"	December 14, 2016	2.0/7 (11)	6.81	1.7	4.10	3.7	10.91 (+85%)
10	"Ringmaster Keifth"	January 4, 2017	2.4/8 (5)	7.57 (19)	1.6	3.99	4.0	11.56 (+67%)
11	"Sarge & Pea"	January 11, 2017	2.3/8 (6)	7.59 (12)	1.7	3.95	4.0	11.54 (+74%)
12	"Do You Believe in Magic"	February 8, 2017	2.3/8 (5)	7.34 (18)	1.6	3.99	3.9	11.33 (+70%)
13	"Do It Yourself"	February 15, 2017	2.0/7 (5)	6.92 (21)	1.6	3.74	3.6	10.66 (+80%)
14	"Heavy is the Head"	February 22, 2017	2.0/7 (9)	6.65 (24)	1.6	3.78	3.6	10.42 (+80%)
15	"Finding Fizbo"	March 1, 2017	2.0/7 (5)	6.41	—N/a	—N/a	—N/a	—N/a
16	"Basketball"	March 8, 2017	1.9/7 (6)	6.49 (21)	1.6	3.99	3.5	10.48 (+84%)
17	"Pig Moon Rising"	March 15, 2017	1.9/7 (8)	6.12 (24)	1.5	3.63	3.4	9.76 (+79%)
18	"Five Minutes"	March 29, 2017	2.1/7 (8)	6.79 (21)	1.4	3.50	3.5	10.29 (+67%)
19	"Frank's Wedding"	April 5, 2017	1.9/7 (6)	6.25 (25)	1.4	3.32	3.3	9.57 (+74%)
20	"All Things Being Equal"	May 3, 2017	1.7/6 (7)	5.65	1.5	3.67	3.2	9.32 (+88%)
21	"Alone Time"	May 10, 2017	1.6/6 (8)	5.71 (25)	1.3	3.32	2.9	9.03 (+81%)
22	"The Graduates"	May 17, 2017	1.7/6 (6)	6.20 (17)	1.5	3.49	3.2	9.69 (+88%)

== DVD release ==
Modern Family: The Complete Eight Season
Set Details		Special Features
22 episodes; 3-disc set; 1.78:1 aspect ratio; English (Dolby Digital 5.1); Subtitles: English, Spanish and French; Runtime: 474 minutes		Deleted and Alternate Scenes; Gag Reel
Release Dates
Region 1	Region 2	Region 4
September 19, 2017	September 4, 2017	November 11, 2017
