= Do You Believe in Magic (Modern Family) =

- Modern Family episode
- Episode no.: Season 8 Episode 12
- Directed by: Gail Mancuso
- Written by: Jon Pollack
- Production code: 8ARG15
- Original air date: February 8, 2017

Guest appearances
- Nathan Fillion as Rainor Shine; Elizabeth Banks as Sal

Episode chronology
← Previous "Sarge & Pea"	Next → "Do It Yourself"
- Modern Family season 8

"Do You Believe in Magic" is the twelfth episode of the eighth season of the American sitcom Modern Family, and the series' 178th episode overall. It aired on American Broadcasting Company (ABC) in the United States on February 8, 2017. The episode was written by Jon Pollack, and directed by Gail Mancuso.

== Plot summary ==
Claire decides to hire a magician who could help her and Phil bring some mystery on Valentine's Day. Cam and Mitch teach Haley and Sal (Elizabeth Banks) to stand up against their men with unexpected results. As Jay has developed the habit to prefer Joe over Manny, Alex discovers that Ben, Claire's assistant, has a crush on her.

== Reception ==
=== Ratings ===
In its original U.S. broadcast, "Do You Believe in Magic" was watched by 7.34 million people; down by 0.73 from the previous episode.

=== Reviews ===
Kyle Fowle of The A.V. Club gave episode a B+, saying "“Do You Believe In Magic” isn’t a perfect episode, but it does hit a rewarding sweet spot between saccharine and hilarious."
