= Blindsided (Modern Family) =

- Modern Family episode
- Episode no.: Season 8 Episode 3
- Directed by: Jim Hensz
- Written by: Christy Stratton; Danny Zuker
- Production code: 8ARG02
- Original air date: October 5, 2016

Guest appearances
- Martin Short as Merv Schechter; Winston Duke as Dwight

Episode chronology
← Previous "A Stereotypical Day"	Next → "Weathering Heights"
- Modern Family season 8

"Blindsided" is the third episode of the eighth season of the American sitcom Modern Family. It aired on October 5, 2016, on American Broadcasting Company (ABC). The episode is directed by Ryan Case and written by Stephen Levitan.

== Plot ==
Alex (Ariel Winter) still has mono and is not allowed to talk for two days. Haley (Sarah Hyland) decides to start her own business and enlists Phil's (Ty Burrell) help. He introduces her to Merv Schechter (Martin Short), a promotion expert, but Haley isn't thrilled to meet him, and Phil accidentally tells her he does not believe in her at all. Later, Haley proves to be capable when she offers help to her dad who has trouble selling a house where the previous owners were murdered.

Claire (Julie Bowen) and Luke (Nolan Gould) are called in to Principal Brown's office to discuss Luke's future and learn that he has a bad file and has no chance to go to college unless he chooses an extra-curricular activity. He decides to be a candidate at the student president election with Claire as his campaign manager. Jay (Ed O'Neill) and Gloria (Sofía Vergara) are not comfortable with this, because Manny (Rico Rodriguez) is also running. Both teenagers are pressured by their parents with Luke being forced to wear a suit and Manny to act like a rapper. Luke wins the election.

Mitchell (Jesse Tyler Ferguson) is unhappy that Cameron (Eric Stonestreet) let his star football player Dwight (Winston Duke) live with them after his father moved away without asking him first. Lily (Aubrey Anderson-Emmons) is also unhappy due to the amount of food that Dwight eats. Cameron decides to ask Dwight to leave, but Mitchell is so flattered by the public acclaim he receives for saving the team's star player he agrees to let him stay.

== Reception ==
Kyle Fowle of The A.V. Club gave the episode a B.
