= Halloween 4: The Revenge of Rod Skyhook =

- Modern Family episode
- Episode no.: Season 8 Episode 5
- Directed by: Chris Koch
- Written by: Stephen Lloyd
- Production code: 8ARG06
- Original air date: October 26, 2016

Guest appearance
- Robert Costanzo as Earl Chambers

Episode chronology
← Previous "Weathering Heights"	Next → "Grab It"
- Modern Family season 8

"Halloween 4: The Revenge of Rod Skyhook" is the fifth episode of the eighth season of the American sitcom Modern Family. It aired on October 26, 2016 on American Broadcasting Company (ABC). The episode is directed by Chris Koch and written by Stephen Lloyd. The name of the episode is a parody of the 1988 slasher film Halloween 4: The Return of Michael Myers.

== Plot ==
It's Halloween and Luke (Nolan Gould) organizes a party. However, Claire (Julie Bowen) and Phil (Ty Burrell) realize that no one is going to turn up. With the help of Phil, who body pops in a beaver costume, Haley (Sarah Hyland) and Claire, who manage to convince people to leave another more popular party to go to Luke’s, the party proves to be a success.

Jay (Ed O'Neill) and Gloria (Sofía Vergara) dress themselves as Joseph and Mary, as Joe is supposed to be Jesus. Manny (Rico Rodriguez) has chosen a Dalton Trumbo costume, which no one recognizes to a party at Earl Chambers' house. Jay initially wants Manny to play a prank on Earl, but after an angry confrontation he decides to bury the hatchet and end the feud. Finally, Manny is dropped at Luke’s place and meets a girl wearing a Dorothy Parker costume who finally identifies his Trumbo outfit.

Mitchell (Jesse Tyler Ferguson), Cameron (Eric Stonestreet), and Lily (Aubrey Anderson-Emmons) pursue a boy who Cameron believes threw an egg at him. It turns out that the boy didn't throw it, it actually was Claire, in response to Mitchell who began a prank war against his older sister. However, Claire missed Mitchell and hit Cameron instead. Cameron is very happy however, that his husband stood up for him when confronted by the boy's father.

== Reception ==
Kyle Fowle of The A.V. Club gave the episode a "B−".
