= The Alliance (Modern Family) =

- Modern Family episode
- Episode no.: Season 8 Episode 8
- Directed by: James Bagdonas
- Written by: Andy Gordon; Ryan Walls
- Production code: 8ARG09
- Original air date: November 30, 2016

Guest appearances
- Nathan Fillion as Rainer Shine; Joely Fisher as Maggie Braithwaite

Episode chronology
← Previous "Thanksgiving Jamboree"	Next → "Snow Ball"
- Modern Family season 8

"The Alliance" is the eighth episode of the eighth season of the American sitcom Modern Family. It aired on November 30, 2016 on American Broadcasting Company (ABC). The episode is directed by James Bagdonas and written by Andy Gordon and Ryan Walls.

== Plot ==
Gloria (Sofia Vergara), Phil (Ty Burrell), and Cameron (Eric Stonestreet) reveal that being married to a Pritchett is not always easy which is the reason why they formed an alliance against their judgmental spouses. Gloria helps Cameron to get rid of two Russian guests who are refusing to leave the rented upstairs unit and Cameron and Phil conspire to hide the evidence of the electric shock collar which Gloria has bought for Stella against Jay's wishes. This scheme backfires when Phil triggers the electric shock collar he has hidden on his person, and Manny (Rico Rodriguez) discovers that orange juice Gloria was supposed to buy (and which also the code for the alliance) is missing from the fridge, arousing Mitchell's suspicions.

A widow at the country club becomes infatuated with Luke (Nolan Gould) and Jay tries to take advantage of the situation by getting her to sign a petition to allow cigar smoking inside the club.

Haley (Sarah Hyland) decides to know Rainer’s daughter April better but she ends up in a parental role instead, which makes her very uncomfortable.

The entire family are to vote on the destination for the family holiday; but Jay, Claire, and Mitchell overrule this as payback for the Alliance's behaviour, deciding on Italy. Cameron, Phil, and Gloria pretend to be sad, but it is revealed in the final scenes that they wanted Italy all along and had been conspiring to influence their spouses' decisions using subtle language and Italian-themed props.

== Reception ==
=== Broadcasting ===
The episode was watched by 6.81 million viewers, down 0.52 million people from the previous episode.

=== Reviews ===
The episode received positive reviews from TV critics. Kyle Fowle of The A.V. Club gave the episode a B+, stating that "still has some playfulness and imaginative spirit to spare in its eighth season." Nora Williamson from Tell-Tale TV gave a positive review to the episode also, rating it 4/5 stars. She went on to say "the aging show still has some tricks up its sleeves and has the power to surprise and entertain." Saloni Gajjar from SpoilerTV wrote about the episode positively. She described the episode as "one of the best episodes of “Modern Family” this season."
