= Thanksgiving Jamboree =

- Modern Family episode
- Episode no.: Season 8 Episode 7
- Directed by: Steven Levitan
- Written by: Jon Pollack; Chuck Tatham
- Production code: 8ARG08
- Original air date: November 16, 2016

Guest appearance
- Nathan Fillion as Rainer Shine

Episode chronology
← Previous "Grab It"	Next → "The Alliance"
- Modern Family season 8

"Thanksgiving Jamboree" is the seventh episode of the eighth season of the American sitcom Modern Family. It aired on November 16, 2016 on American Broadcasting Company (ABC). The episode is directed by Steven Levitan and written by Ellion and Asa .

== Plot ==
Mitchell (Jesse Tyler Ferguson) and Cameron (Eric Stonestreet) host a Thanksgiving Jamboree at their home. Mitchell confesses to Claire (Julie Bowen) that he has gone along with the theme because he accidentally gave Cameron's Fizbo the Clown costume away. Cameron is unexpectedly understanding and later reveals that he spent all the money the couple had planned to use in order to go to a Hawaiian vacation.

Phil (Ty Burrell) is not very happy to learn that Haley (Sarah Hyland) prefers going away to Cabo with Rainer Shine rather than play in their customary game of football. Alex (Ariel Winter), though no longer infected with mono, gets closer to Dwight and Manny (Rico Rodriguez) finally gets Luke’s (Nolan Gould) respect since his recent election as school president.

Jay (Ed O'Neill) has high blood pressure and he found a way to calm himself, singing soft rock songs to himself. Gloria (Sofia Vergara) introduces Joe to a goat, and the family has also invited Jerry, the Dunphys’ former neighbor. While going to the pharmacy, he, Jay, and Phil meet a lawyer who was Dede’s and Jay’s divorce lawyer. The lawyer collapses and Phil ends up being electrocuted while trying to revive him.

Finally, Haley suggests that the annual football family game could be brought forward so the family can play together before her departure. This allows Phil to express his emotions by tackling Rainer to the ground.

== Reception ==
Kyle Fowle of The A.V. Club gave the episode a B+.
