= I'm Not Here =

2017 drama film by Michelle Schumacher

- Theatrical release poster
- Directed by: Michelle Schumacher
- Written by: Michelle Schumacher; Tony Cummings
- Produced by: Michelle Schumacher; Randle Schumacher; Eric Radzan
- Starring: J.K. Simmons; Sebastian Stan; Mandy Moore; Max Greenfield
- Cinematography: Pete Villani
- Edited by: Michelle Schumacher
- Music by: Nima Fakhrara
- Production company: Rubber Tree Productions
- Distributed by: Gravitas Ventures
- Release dates: September 21, 2017 (Raindance); March 8, 2019 (United States)
- Running time: 76 minutes
- Country: United States
- Language: English

I'm Not Here is a 2017 American drama film, directed, edited, and produced by Michelle Schumacher, from a screenplay by Schumacher and Tony Cummings. It stars J.K. Simmons, Sebastian Stan, Maika Monroe, Mandy Moore, Max Greenfield and Iain Armitage. It had its world premiere at the Raindance Film Festival on September 21, 2017, and was released in the United States on March 8, 2019, by Gravitas Ventures.

== Plot ==
Struggling with tragic memories of his past, Steve has cut himself off from the world. With his own world coming apart, he re-connects with the events of his life to discover how he ended up alone and broken, while still nurturing hope.

== Cast ==
- J.K. Simmons as Old Steve
  - Sebastian Stan as Young Steve
  - Iain Armitage as Baby Steve
- Maika Monroe as Karen
- Mandy Moore as Mom
- Max Greenfield as Dad
- Jeremy Maguire as Trevor
- Harold Perrineau as Santana
- David Koechner as Dad's Attorney
- Heather Mazur as Mom's Attorney
- David Wexler as Adam
- Tony Cummings as Judge

== Production ==
In May 2016, it was announced J.K. Simmons, Sebastian Stan, Maika Monroe, Max Greenfield, Mandy Moore, David Koechner, Harold Perrineau, Iain Armitage and Jeremy Maguire had joined the cast of the film, with Michelle Schumacher directing the film, from a screenplay by Schumacher and Tony Cummings. Schumacher, Randle Schumacher and Eric Radzan producing the film, under their Rubber Tree Productions banner. Filming took place over 23 days in Los Angeles. In February 2017, it was announced Nima Fakhrara had composed the film's score.

== Release ==
The film had its world premiere at the Raindance Film Festival on September 21, 2017. It also screened at the San Diego Film Festival on April 25, 2018. It was released on March 8, 2019.

== Reception ==
On review aggregator Rotten Tomatoes, the film holds an approval rating of 38% based on 16 reviews, with an average rating of 4.97/10. Metacritic gave the film a weighted average score of 45 out of 100, based on 9 critics, indicating "mixed or average" reviews.
