= Grab It (Modern Family) =

- Modern Family episode
- Episode no.: Season 8 Episode 6
- Directed by: Beth McCarthy-Miller
- Written by: Jeffrey Richman
- Production code: 8ARG05
- Original air date: November 9, 2016

Guest appearance
- Joseph Calliari as Congress Man

Episode chronology
← Previous "Halloween IV : Revenge of Rod Skyhook"	Next → "Thanksgiving Jamboree"
- Modern Family season 8

"Grab It" is the sixth episode of the eighth season of the American sitcom Modern Family. It aired on November 9, 2016, on American Broadcasting Company (ABC). The episode is directed by Beth McCarthy Miller and written by Jeffrey Richman.

== Plot ==
Mitchell (Jesse Tyler Ferguson) and Cameron (Eric Stonestreet) go to an immersive theater play. The play is about a reunion of high school buddies and every night, a viewer is picked in order to play Vlad, a student from Europe, on stage. Mitchell gets picked but does not want to perform. When he learns that Cameron plays a very sick janitor, Mitch seizes the opportunity and spoils the play.

Luke (Nolan Gould) gets a job at Jay's (Ed O'Neill) country club as he graduates this year. Phil (Ty Burrell) is very impressed by the club and wants to be a member. Jay pretends to back his application, believing that Phil will screw up his chances anyway, but it turns out that Phil makes a great impression on the other members. Jay doesn't want Phil to join, since this is the only place where Jay has peace and quiet. After he explains this, Phil withdraws his application on condition that Jay goes trampolining with him, and then to the same play as Mitchell and Cameron, where Jay also gets picked to perform.

Gloria (Sofía Vergara) wants to have a night for herself as Manny (Rico Rodriguez) will be attending a party and Joe will soon fall asleep. Things backfire when Manny comes home earlier because of an embarrassing incident and Joe accidentally drinks coffee, making him hyperactive. Claire (Julie Bowen) manages to solve Gloria's problems for her, explaining that children always seem to listen to other adults before their parents. She is feeling jealous of a business guru, who appears to have inspired Alex (Ariel Winter). However, Alex is eventually disillusioned with the guru who turns out to be self-obsessed; Alex follows Claire's advice and gets a job.

== Reception ==
Kyle Fowle of The A.V. Club gave the episode a B−.
