= Grab It Here =

Chain of stores in 20th century

Grab It Here was a chain of cash-and-carry stores that existed from 1903 to the end of the 20th century in Illinois and Indiana.

C. Sherman Paxton moved to Illinois from Kentucky as a coal miner around 1901. He began saving money to open his own grocery store. By 1903, he had saved $185 (6474 in modern terms) and opened a small store in Georgetown, Illinois. The store was originally called simply the "C. S. Paxton Store", and he ran it on credit and made deliveries; Paxton closed the store for a time during a coal strike but returned later and opened the store again.

In 1919, Paxton opened a cash-only store managed by his son Ernie and it was here that the "Grab-It-Here" name first appeared. By the 1930s, there were several cash-and-carry stores in operation. By 1941, that grew to a chain of 40 stores. In 1968, Grab-It-Here became affiliated with Dolly Madison Industries. By the 1980s, the chain was defunct.

C. S. Paxton died in 1950.

== Locations ==
Here is a list of stores according to an anniversary brochure from the 1960s:

Store	Address	City	State
1M	101 North State Street	Georgetown	Illinois
3M	143 North State Street	Westville	Illinois
7M	Illinois Street	Chrisman	Illinois
9M	103 Main Street	Homer	Illinois
11M	Yates Street	Newman	Illinois
18M	12 South Hazel Street	Danville	Illinois
21	Main Street	Kingman	Indiana
22M	Main Street	Potomac	Illinois
25M	320 Washington Street	Covington	Indiana
27M	206 Main Street	Veedersburg	Indiana
30	Buena Vista	Kansas	Illinois
32M	108 Washington Street	Williamsport	Indiana
37M	100 Jones Street	Milford	Illinois
38M	517 West Madison Street	Danville	Illinois
46	Main Street	Boswell	Indiana
47M	102 Chicago Street	Rossville	Illinois
51M	129 North Central Street	Paris	Illinois
57M	25 West Fourth Street	Sheldon	Illinois
66M	220 North Market Street	Paxton	Illinois
69M	2715 North Vermilion Street	Danville	Illinois
70M	Jefferson and York Streets	Rockville	Indiana
71M	855 East Fairchild Street	Danville	Illinois
72M	Prospect and Sherwood Streets	Champaign	Illinois
73M	200 East Main Street	Attica	Indiana
74M	Seymour and 4th Streets	Kentland	Indiana
75M	2nd and Walnuts Streets	Watseka	Illinois
76M	1113 East Main Street	Danville	Illinois
77M	317 South Market Street	Hoopeston	Illinois
78M	Pembroke and Parke Streets	Tuscola	Illinois
79M	Division and Hubbard Streets	Cayuga	Indiana
80M	1615 Springfield	Champaign	Illinois
81M	109 East Market Street	Crawfordsville	Indiana
82M	417 South Gilbert Street	Danville	Illinois
83M	Fairchild and Robinson Streets	Danville	Illinois
84M	Adams and Fourth Streets	Fowler	Indiana
