= Marsha Kramer =

American actress (1945–2020)

- Born: June 19, 1945; Chicago, Illinois, U.S.
- Died: January 23, 2020 (aged 74); Los Angeles, California, U.S.
- Education: University of California, Los Angeles; Royal Academy of Dramatic Art
- Occupation: Actress

Marsha Kramer (June 19, 1945 – January 23, 2020) was an American theater and television actress. She made television appearances in The Waltons, Touched by an Angel, Frasier, NCIS, Dr. Ken, Eagleheart, Days of Our Lives, Out of Order, Malcolm in the Middle, and Modern Family.

== Filmography ==
=== Film ===
Year	Title	Role	Notes
1990	White Palace	Additional voice	
2001	On Edge	Skate Mother #2	
2002	Ice Age	Various	

=== Television ===
Year	Title	Role	Notes
1970	The Bill Cosby Show	Donna	Episode: "Driven to Distraction"
1975	Lucas Tanner	Girl	Episode: "What's Wrong with Bobbie?"
1975	The Waltons	Peggy Hill	Episode: "The Emergence"
1977	The Bob Newhart Show	Receptionist	Episode: "Shrinking Violence"
1988	Newhart	Suzy	Episode: "The Gleeless Club"
1990	Life Goes On	Edna Muckerman	Episode: "Thacher and Henderson"
1990	Cheers	Talk Show Lady	Episode: "Severe Crane Damage"
1993	Love & War	Nun	Episode: "I Love a Parade"
1996–1998	Frasier	Tooty / Anne	3 episodes
1998	Touched by an Angel	Gloria	Episode: "Only Connect"
2000	Titus	Eva	Episode: "Sex with Pudding"
2001	Malcolm in the Middle	Toni	Episode: "Charity"
2003	Out of Order	Hamster / Plant	6 episodes
2007	Days of Our Lives	Nurse Emily	Episode #1.10718
2013	Eagleheart	Eleanor Moss	Episode: "Whitley"
2013–2020	Modern Family	Margaret	14 episodes
2016	Dr. Ken	Thelma	Episode: "Delayed in Honolulu"
2018	NCIS	Old Woman	Episode: "What Child is This?"
