= Vali Chandrasekaran =

American comedy writer and producer

- Born: 1981 or 1982 (age 44–45)
- Education: Harvard University
- Occupation: Television writer
- Spouse: Nithya Raman
- Children: 2
- Writing career
- Genre: comedy
- Notable works: 30 Rock; My Name Is Earl; Modern Family

Vali Chandrasekaran (born 1981/1982) is an American television screenwriter and producer. He is known for his work on the comedy series My Name Is Earl, 30 Rock, and Modern Family. He has received five Primetime Emmy nominations for Outstanding Comedy Series. He is the First Gentleman-elect of Los Angeles.

== Early life and education ==
Chandrasekaran was raised in Athens, Pennsylvania, the son of Tamil immigrant parents from India. He is a 1999 graduate of Athens High School. He graduated from Harvard University, where he wrote for the The Harvard Lampoon. He then worked as a consultant for Boston Consulting Group in Los Angeles while writing spec scripts on the side.

== Career ==
His first position in television was when he was hired as a writer and producer on My Name Is Earl (2005). He later worked on 30 Rock as writer and supervising producer and Modern Family as writer, producer, and executive producer. He has received five Primetime Emmy nominations as producer for 30 Rock (2011, 2012) and Modern Family (2015, 2016, 2017) and shared a Writers Guild of America Award for Comedy Series as part of the 30 Rock writing team.

Chandrasekaran and Steve Hely wrote the 2008 comic travelogue The Ridiculous Race: 26,000 Miles, 2 Guides, 1 Globe, No Airplanes, about their race around the world without airplanes. Later credits include writing and producing work on series such as American Born Chinese, Nobody Wants This, The Four Seasons, and Deli Boys. He made a brief on-screen appearance in The Office.

== Personal life ==
In 2010, Chandrasekaran married Nithya Raman, who he met at college. They have twin children, Karna and Kaveri, and live in the Silver Lake neighborhood of Los Angeles. In 2026, Raman was elected mayor of Los Angeles.

== External sources ==
- "Vali Chandrasekaran". IMDB.
