= Jeremy Maguire =

American child actor (born in 2011)

- Born: August 10, 2011 (age 15)
- Occupation: Actor
- Years active: 2015–present

Jeremy Maguire (born August 10, 2011) is an American child actor. He is most known for playing Joe Pritchett on the sitcom Modern Family from 2015 to 2020. In 2017, Maguire made his film debut in the drama film I'm Not Here.

== Career ==
Maguire made his acting debut in the ABC series Modern Family as Joe Pritchett. The role was initially played by Pierce Wallace, but Maguire succeeded him when the producers wanted an older actor. In 2016, Maguire appeared in a commercial for Tide. Maguire made his feature film debut in I'm Not Here opposite J.K. Simmons and Sebastian Stan.

== Filmography ==
=== Film ===
Year	Title	Role	Notes
2017	I'm Not Here	Trevor	

=== Television ===
Year	Title	Role	Notes
2015–2020	Modern Family	Joe Pritchett	Main role
2016	Untitled Sarah Silverman Project	Russell	Television film
2018	The Last Ship	Frankie Green	Episode: "Warriors"
2020	A Modern Farewell	Himself	Modern Family documentary
2021	Turner & Hooch	Matthew Garland	Main role
2023	S.W.A.T.	Micah	Episode: "Witness"
