= Modern Family =

American television sitcom (2009–2020)

- Genre: Sitcom; Cringe comedy; Comedy drama; Mockumentary
- Created by: Christopher Lloyd; Steven Levitan
- Showrunners: Christopher Lloyd; Steven Levitan
- Starring: Ed O'Neill; Sofía Vergara; Julie Bowen; Ty Burrell; Jesse Tyler Ferguson; Eric Stonestreet; Sarah Hyland; Ariel Winter; Nolan Gould; Rico Rodriguez; Aubrey Anderson-Emmons; Jeremy Maguire; Reid Ewing
- Theme music composer: Gabriel Mann
- Composer: Gabriel Mann
- Country of origin: United States
- Original language: English
- No. of seasons: 11
- No. of episodes: 250 (list of episodes)

Production
- Executive producers: Steven Levitan; Christopher Lloyd; Jeffrey Morton; Paul Corrigan; Dan O'Shannon; Brad Walsh; Danny Zuker; Bill Wrubel; Jeffrey Richman; Abraham Higginbotham; Stephen Lloyd; Elaine Ko; Chuck Tatham; Vali Chandrasekaran; Jon Pollack; Jack Burditt
- Producers: Jeffrey Morton; Chris Smirnoff; Sally Young; Becky Mann; Audra Sielaff
- Production location: Los Angeles, California
- Cinematography: David Hennings (Pilot); James R. Bagdonas; Hugo Cortina
- Camera setup: Single camera
- Running time: 20–24 minutes
- Production companies: Lloyd-Levitan (2009–12); Picador Productions (2012–20); Steven Levitan Productions (2012–20); 20th Century Fox Television

Original release
- Network: ABC
- Release: September 23, 2009 – April 8, 2020

Modern Family is an American television mockumentary sitcom created by Christopher Lloyd and Steven Levitan for ABC. It aired for 11 seasons from September 23, 2009, to April 8, 2020. The series follows the lives of three diverse but interrelated family set-ups living in suburban Los Angeles.

Lloyd and Levitan conceived the series while sharing stories of their own "modern families." Modern Family employs an ensemble cast and is presented in a mockumentary style, with the characters frequently speaking directly to the camera in confessional interview segments.

Modern Family was highly acclaimed by critics throughout its first few seasons. Its critical reception became more mixed as it progressed. The final season received positive reviews, and the finale episode had 7.37 million first-run viewers. The retrospective documentary that aired before the final episode had 6.72 million first-run viewers. The series won a total of 22 Primetime Emmy Awards, including five Emmy Awards for Outstanding Comedy Series, four Emmy Awards for Outstanding Supporting Actor in a Comedy Series (twice each for Eric Stonestreet and Ty Burrell), and two Emmy Awards for Outstanding Supporting Actress in a Comedy Series (both for Julie Bowen). It also won the Golden Globe Award for Best Television Series – Musical or Comedy in 2011.

The broadcast syndication rights to the series were sold to NBCUniversal's USA Network, the stations of Fox Television Stations, and various other local stations in other markets for a fall 2013 premiere. The success of the series led to it being the 10th-highest revenue-generating show for 2012, earning $2.13 million an episode.

== Premise ==
Modern Family revolves around three different types of families (nuclear, blended, and same-sex with adoptive child) living in suburban Los Angeles, who are interrelated through their patriarch, Jay Pritchett, and his two adult children, Claire and Mitchell.

Jay remarried a much younger woman, Gloria Delgado (née Ramirez), a passionate Colombian immigrant with whom he has a young son, Fulgencio "Joe" Joseph (born in the middle of the fourth season), and a stepson from Gloria's previous marriage, Manuel "Manny" Delgado. Jay's and Gloria's respective former spouses, DeDe and Javier, both also make occasional appearances in the show. They also adopt a dog, Stella, in the second season. Manny briefly has a turtle named Shell Turtlestein.

Claire was a homemaker, though returned to the business world in the fifth season, eventually becoming the chief executive officer of her father's business, Pritchett's Closets and Blinds. Claire is married to Phil Dunphy, a realtor and a self-professed "cool dad" originally from Key West, Florida. Claire and Phil have three children: Haley, a stereotypically ditzy wild teenaged girl; Alex, the middle child who is highly intelligent, gifted, and introverted; and Luke, the offbeat only son, known for his playful, immature, and sometimes dim-witted nature. Haley's on-and-off boyfriend, Dylan, is a permanent fixture on the show, with the two eventually marrying and having twins, Poppy and George, in the tenth season.

Mitchell is a lawyer who is in a same-sex relationship with Cameron Tucker. Cam, from a farm in Missouri, is a former music teacher and later works as a football coach and vice-principal. The couple have adopted a baby daughter, Lily, of Vietnamese origin. Cam is a stay-at-home dad in the first couple seasons when Lily is young. Mitchell and Cameron are legally married in the fifth season, following the Californian legalization of gay marriage. At the end of the series, they adopt another child—a son, Rexford—and move to Missouri.

As the title suggests, it depicts a modern-day tight-knit extended family; many episodes are comically based on situations that many families encounter in real life.

== Cast and characters ==
=== Main ===
- Ed O'Neill as Jay Francis Pritchett: The wealthy patriarch of the family; husband of Gloria; father of Claire, Mitchell, and Joe; and stepfather of Manny. He is the founder and CEO of Pritchett's Closets & Blinds. After retiring, he later starts a dog bed business, Dog Beds by Stella.
- Sofía Vergara as Gloria María Pritchett (née Ramírez): Jay's second wife; mother of Manny (with her first husband Javier) and Joe (with Jay). Originally from Colombia, she is passionate, outspoken, and family-oriented. She later launches a hot sauce business based on a family recipe. Even later, she becomes a realtor under Phil's mentorship.
- Julie Bowen as Claire Melinda Dunphy (née Pritchett): Jay and Dede's daughter; Mitchell's sister; Phil's wife; and mother of Haley, Alex, and Luke. She is organized and high-strung. She succeeds Jay as CEO of Pritchett's Closets & Blinds before eventually stepping down.
- Ty Burrell as Philip Humphrey "Phil" Dunphy: Claire's husband and father of Haley, Alex, and Luke. A real estate agent known for his enthusiastic personality, he later becomes a real estate professor. He is also an amateur magician and briefly owns a magic shop.
- Jesse Tyler Ferguson as Mitchell Vincent Pritchett: Jay and Dede's son; Claire's brother; Cameron's husband; and adoptive father of Lily and Rexford. He works as a lawyer, primarily in environmental law, and later becomes a prosecutor.
- Eric Stonestreet as Cameron Scott Tucker: Mitchell's husband and adoptive father of Lily and Rexford. A former clown and music teacher, he later becomes a physical education teacher, football coach, and eventually vice principal.
- Sarah Hyland as Haley Gwendolyn Dunphy: Claire and Phil's eldest daughter; sister of Alex and Luke; wife of Dylan; and mother of twins Poppy and George. Initially portrayed as a stereotypical "party girl," she later pursues a career in fashion and works at NERP, a lifestyle company.
- Ariel Winter as Alexandria Anastasia "Alex" Dunphy: Claire and Phil's middle child; sister of Haley and Luke. Highly intelligent and academically driven, she attends the California Institute of Technology and later works in scientific research, including a position in Antarctica.
- Nolan Gould as Lucas Philip "Luke" Dunphy: Claire and Phil's youngest child; brother of Haley and Alex. Known for his goofy and inventive personality, he later attends college and pursues business ventures.
- Rico Rodriguez as Manuel Alberto Javier Alejandro "Manny" Delgado: Gloria and Javier's son; Jay's stepson; and Joe's half-brother. He is mature for his age, with interests in poetry, film, and the arts, and later attends the California Institute of the Arts.
- Aubrey Anderson-Emmons as Lily Tucker-Pritchett: Mitchell and Cameron's adopted daughter, born in Vietnam. She is known for her dry wit and blunt personality.
  - Portrayed by twins Jaden and Ella Hiller in seasons 1–2.
- Jeremy Maguire as Fulgencio Joseph "Joe" Pritchett: Jay and Gloria's son.
  - Portrayed by Rebecca and Sierra Mark in season 4 and Pierce Wallace in seasons 5–6.
- Reid Ewing as Dylan Stardust Marshall: Haley's on-again, off-again boyfriend who later becomes her husband and the father of their twins, Poppy and George. Though often portrayed as dim-witted, he eventually becomes a nurse.

=== Recurring ===
- Fred Willard as Franklin Bernard "Frank" Dunphy: Phil's father. He is fun, cheerful and marries Phil's old babysitter in season 8 and dies in season 11. Willard was nominated for Outstanding Guest Actor in a Comedy Series at the 62nd Primetime Emmy Awards, but lost to Neil Patrick Harris's performance on Glee. Willard also received a posthumous nomination in the same category at the 72nd Primetime Creative Arts Emmy Awards in 2020 (seasons 1, 4–6, 8–11)
- Shelley Long as Lillian Diana "DeDe" Pritchett: Jay's ex-wife; Claire and Mitchell's mother. She is spiritual and a vegan Buddhist. Dede is insecure of Gloria and hates her. She dies in season ten (seasons 1–10)
- Justin Kirk as Charles "Charlie" Bingham Jr.: Mitch's boss who owns a sportswear company and invests in environmental issues (seasons 1–3, 5, 7)
- Chazz Palminteri as Vincent aka Shorty: Jay's best friend, in honor of whom Mitchell was given his middle name (seasons 1, 3–5, 9–10)
- Benjamin Bratt as Javier Alberto Alejandro Delgado: Manny's father and Gloria's ex-husband, he is a thrill seeker and is known for his wild and irresponsible behavior (seasons 1, 3, 4, 6, 8, 11)
- Elizabeth Banks as Sal: Mitch and Cam's fun-loving party animal friend who officiates their wedding and hates Lily. Banks was nominated for Outstanding Guest Actress in a Comedy Series at the 67th Primetime Creative Arts Emmy Awards in 2015 (seasons 1, 4–6, 8, 11)
- Nathan Lane as Pepper Paul Saltzman: Mitch and Cam's close friend and wedding planner, who plans their wedding. Ronaldo's partner and Lionel's dad. (seasons 2, 4–7, 9–10)
- Kevin Daniels as Longines: Mitch and Cam's friend who owns a local boutique and gets attacked by Phil with cologne in season 2 (seasons 2–7, 9–11)
- Celia Weston as Barbara Jessica "Barb" Tucker: Cam and Pam's mother, Mitch's mother-in-law, and Lily, Rexford, and Cal's grandmother from Missouri (seasons 2, 5, 8)
- Colin Hanlon as Steven: Cam and Mitch's friend and Stefan's partner (seasons 3–4, 5, 9)
- Rodrigo Rojas as Stefan: Cam and Mitch's friends, and Steven's partner (season 3–4, 5, 11)
- Spenser McNeild as Reuben: Manny, and Luke's friend from school, who is in love with Alex and has a short relationship with her, much to her embarrassment (seasons 4, 5, 7–9)
- Stephanie Beatriz as Sonia Pilar Ramirez: Gloria's sister and Manny and Joe's aunt. She and Gloria have an ongoing feud throughout the series
- Rob Riggle as Gilbert Paul "Gil" Thorpe: Phil's realtor rival, who later comes out as gay (seasons 4–6, 8–11)
- Adam DeVine as Andrew "Andy" Bailey Jr.: Jay and Gloria's "manny" (male nanny) from Utah, Phil's assistant and Haley's boyfriend (seasons 5–8 and 10)
- Andy Daly as Principal Brown: the principal at Alex, Luke and Manny's high school, and Cam's boss, who is chronically single (seasons 5–6, 8, 10)
- Matthew Risch as Jotham: Mitch and Cam's friend (seasons 5–7, 9–11)
- Dana Powell as Pameron Jessica Tucker: Cam's sister, Mitchells sister-in-law and Lily's aunt (seasons 5, 7–10)
- Marsha Kramer as Margaret: Jay's assistant for 40 years at Pritchett's Closets. She works for Alex temporarily until she is fired/retires (seasons 5, 7–9, 11)
- Christian Barillas as Ronaldo: Pepper's party planning assistant and later partner; parent of Lionel (seasons 5–11)
- Joe Mande as Ben: a marketing executive at Pritchett's Closets and later Alex's boyfriend (seasons 6–9)
- Laura Ashley Samuels as Beth: Andy's girlfriend, fiancée and later ex-fiancée who works in the coast guard. She hates Haley with a burning passion.
- Steve Zahn as Ronnie LaFontaine and Andrea Anders as Amber LaFontaine: Phil and Claire's annoying and obnoxious neighbors (season 6)
- Kasey Mahaffy as Dom: a designer at Pritchett's Closets (seasons 7–9, 11)
- Nathan Fillion as Rainer Shine: a weather forecaster, Phil's friend and later Haley's 25-year-older boyfriend. He and Haley get engaged in a restaurant before suddenly breaking up (seasons 8–9)
- Mira Sorvino as Nicole Rosemary Page: Haley's boss, founder of NERP; parody of Gwyneth Paltrow and her company Goop (seasons 9–10)
- Chris Geere as Arvin Fennerman: a British physics lecturer at CalTech who dates Haley and later Alex. He starts a research project in Switzerland that Alex joins at the end of season 11 (seasons 9–11)
- Marcello Reyes as Calhoun "Cal" Tucker: Pam's son; Mitch and Cam's nephew who lives with them when Pam is in prison (season 10)
- Jimmy Tatro as Bill: Alex's fire-fighter boyfriend who isn't very smart but is known for his muscle and attractiveness (seasons 9–11)

=== Family tree ===
The characters in green have regular roles on the show. Dotted lines indicate a parental relationship through adoption or marriage, and dashed lines indicate a divorce between characters.

Javier Delgado	Gloria Ramirez
Joe Pritchett
Manny Delgado	Merle Tucker	Barb Tucker
Pameron Tucker	Cameron Tucker
Calhoun Johnson	Lily Tucker-Pritchett

Jay Pritchett
Mitchell Pritchett
Rexford Tucker-Pritchett

DeDe Williams	Grace Dunphy	Frank Dunphy
Claire Pritchett	Phil Dunphy
Dylan Marshall	Haley Dunphy	Alex Dunphy	Luke Dunphy
George Marshall	Poppy Marshall

== Production ==
=== Initial development ===
As creators Christopher Lloyd and Steven Levitan retold stories about their families, they realized that the stories could be the basis for a show. They started working on the idea of a family being observed in a mockumentary-style show. They later decided that it could be a show about three families and their experiences. It was originally called My American Family, and the camera crew was originally supposed to have been run by a fictitious Dutch filmmaker named Geert Floortje, who had lived as a teenaged exchange student with the Pritchetts and had developed a crush on Claire (while Mitchell had developed a crush on him). The producers later felt that this component was unnecessary, and it was scrapped. Lloyd preferred to look at the show as "a family show done documentary-style".

Lloyd and Levitan pitched the series to CBS, NBC, and ABC (they did not pitch it to Fox because of issues they had with the network over a previous comedy series, Back to You, that Lloyd and Levitan also created and produced). CBS, which was not ready to make a big commitment to the single-camera style of filming, rejected the series. NBC, already broadcasting The Office and Parks and Recreation at the time, decided against taking on a third mockumentary-style show. ABC accepted the pitch.

The pilot episode tested positively with focus groups, resulting in the network ordering 13 episodes and adding it to the 2009–10 fall lineup days ahead of ABC's official schedule announcement. The series was given a full-season pickup in October 2009.

=== Filming ===
Principal photography took place in Los Angeles. Many of the exteriors used are on the city's Westside. The Dunphys' house is in the Cheviot Hills neighborhood. As of 2014, Palisades Charter High School is used for the exteriors of Luke and Manny's school.

Lloyd and Levitan, whose credits both include Frasier, Wings, and Just Shoot Me!, are executive producers of the series, serving as showrunner and head writer under their Lloyd-Levitan Productions label in affiliation with 20th Century Fox Television. The other original producers on the writing team were Paul Corrigan, Sameer Gardezi, Joe Lawson, Dan O'Shannon, Brad Walsh, Caroline Williams, Bill Wrubel, Danny Zuker, and Jeff Morton.

Starting with the second season, Lloyd and Levitan ran the show, not as a team, but separately, with each showrunner supervising half the episodes. "Chris and I are both strong, opinionated people, and we very, very quickly realized it doesn't make sense to sit here and debate each other and waste time," Levitan told The Hollywood Reporter in 2012. "We often come at it from different points of view, so we said, 'Let's just switch off who has final say.'"

=== Litigation ===
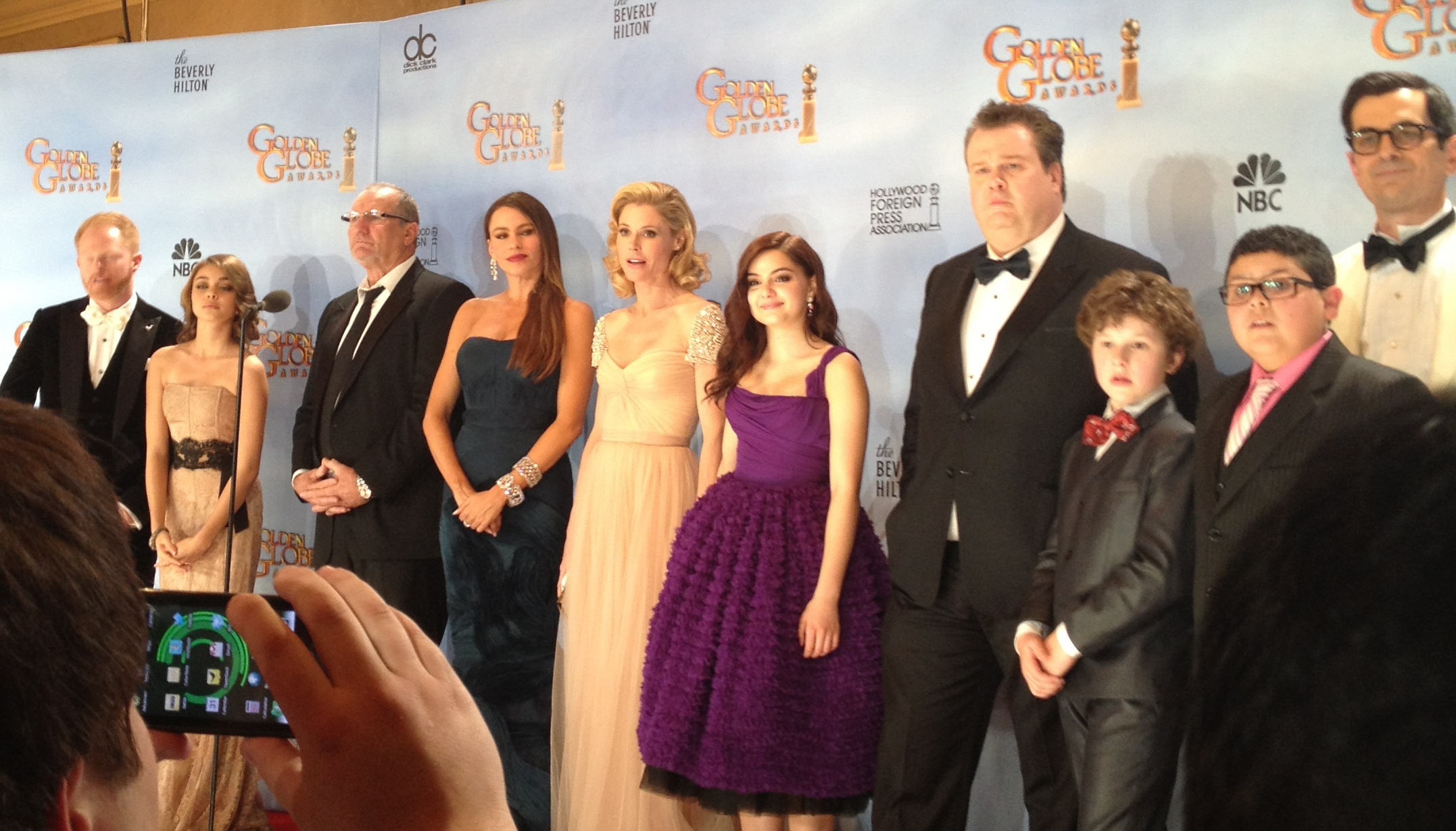
Cast of Modern Family at the 69th Golden Globe Awards in January 2012

In the first season, the adult cast was paid a range of roughly $30,000 to $90,000 per episode. As a result of the show's success, the cast attempted to renegotiate their contracts in the summer of 2012 to obtain higher per-episode fees, but talks broke down to the point that the fourth season's first table read had to be postponed.

Five of the cast members (Ty Burrell, Julie Bowen, Jesse Tyler Ferguson, Eric Stonestreet and Sofía Vergara) retained the Quinn Emanuel law firm and sued 20th Century Fox Television in Los Angeles County Superior Court on July 24, 2012. While not part of the lawsuit, Ed O'Neill joined his fellow castmates in seeking raises for each to about $200,000 per episode; O'Neill had already been earning more money per episode than the other five. The lawsuit invoked the "seven-year rule" in California Labor Code Section 2855 (the De Havilland Law) and requested a declaration that their contracts were void because they were in violation of that rule.

By October 25, 2012, the conflict had been in final talks for a settlement, with plaintiffs planning thereafter to file a dismissal (which they ultimately did on November 19, 2012). The five adult cast members' salaries were increased from $55,000–$65,000 per episode to $150,000–$175,000, with increases every season, plus a percentage of residual profits. O'Neill had already been earning $200,000 an episode, so his salary was lowered to parity with his co-stars, but with a larger percentage of the back-end profits. By that August, four of the five child stars negotiated increases from $15,000–$25,000 to $70,000 per episode, with an additional $10,000 per season raise.

== Episodes ==
Season	Episodes	Originally released		Rank	Average viewers (in millions)
Season	Episodes	First released	Last released	Rank	Average viewers (in millions)
1	24	September 23, 2009	May 19, 2010	36	9.49
2	24	September 22, 2010	May 25, 2011	24	11.89
3	24	September 21, 2011	May 23, 2012	15	12.93
4	24	September 26, 2012	May 22, 2013	18	12.31
5	24	September 25, 2013	May 21, 2014	19	11.79
6	24	September 24, 2014	May 20, 2015	24	11.91
7	22	September 23, 2015	May 18, 2016	36	9.83
8	22	September 21, 2016	May 17, 2017	34	8.79
9	22	September 27, 2017	May 16, 2018	58	7.09
10	22	September 26, 2018	May 8, 2019	65	6.40
11	18	September 25, 2019	April 8, 2020	48	7.10
Special		April 8, 2020		—N/a	—N/a

== Themes and analysis ==
=== Technology and social media ===
In The New York Times, Bruce Feiler called attention to how the show depicts the increasing way communications technology shapes the way people perceive others, even family members. "[It] is surely the first family comedy that incorporates its own hashtag of simultaneous self-analysis directly into the storyline," he writes. "Mark Zuckerberg may be a greater influence on Modern Family than Norman Lear."

The show's writers and actors agree: "We used to talk about how cellphones killed the sitcom because no one ever goes to anyone's house anymore for routine information", Abraham Higginbotham told Feiler. "We embrace technology so it's part of the story." Ty Burrell draws on Fran Lebowitz's observation that there is no institution other than media. "I had this little flash of Phil—and me—that we are parsing our personality together externally from how people perceive us."

=== Parenthood challenges and tradition ===
Modern Family thoroughly explores the different parenting styles and challenges presented by modern circumstances and the unique personalities of children. James Parker of The Atlantic commented, "How does one 'parent'? Who does what, which 'role'? Is Dad sufficiently dad-like and Mom enough of a mom?" Throughout the show, Claire is a "daddy's girl" with a strong relationship with Jay, while Mitch has a much stronger bond with their mother. Jay struggles to connect with his step-son Manny initially, and often ridicules Manny's preferences for luxury and lack of traditionally masculine interests. However, Jay learns to accept and celebrate Manny's unique interests and skills in theater and film.

The gendered expectations of parenting are explored with Claire and Phil's family. Their relationship counters traditional male-dominated family structures by showing Claire as the family's decision maker while Phil is a 'fun dad'. Claire and Phil also deal with their three children's different personalities and life paths as individuals. They attempt to push Haley and Luke to pursue their education seriously and are met with resistance as the two children are more interested in other life paths. Specifically, Claire has a challenging relationship with Haley: Claire thinks she's helping direct Haley's school and career choices, while Haley thinks she's being too pushy and demanding, and will act out accordingly. Ultimately, Claire learns to respect her eldest daughter's decisions regarding family and career, even though she does not necessarily approve of them.

=== Queer family and parenting ===
One parenting challenge is explored with Jay's straining relationship with Mitchell due to his discomfort at having a gay son. This is explored in the season 5 episode "Message Received": gay marriage is legalized and Mitch and Cam decide to get married. Mitchell questions Jay's motives for not inviting his friends to his son's wedding by asking "So, who doesn't want them there, me or you?". Jay admits he doesn't understand gay marriages and blames Mitchell for not making him comfortable by saying "Now see, why do you get to be you, but I don't get to be me. See, I didn't choose to be uncomfortable. I was born this way." In response, Mitch un-invites his father to his wedding, but they later reconcile and Jay saves the wedding by hosting it at his country club and brags about the marriage to other club members.

Modern Family is notable for its portrayal of queer and non-traditional family structures, primarily through the characters of Mitchell Pritchett and Cameron Tucker, a gay couple raising their adopted Vietnamese daughter, Lily. Their family dynamic was one of the first on prime-time television to center a same-sex couple navigating the challenges and rewards of parenthood, offering audiences an authentic look into LGBTQ+ family life. Throughout the series, Mitch and Cam's relationship showcases both the unique joys and social obstacles facing LGBTQ+ parents, such as dealing with stereotypes, facing subtle forms of prejudice, and navigating societal expectations. By depicting Mitch and Cam's journey as parents and partners in a relatable, humorous light, Modern Family has played a significant role in normalizing LGBTQ+ families in mainstream media. The show's inclusion of various family forms, from blended families to adoptive and queer families, reflects a more inclusive view of what family means today and has been credited with increasing public acceptance of LGBTQ+ families. This representation contributes to broader conversations on family diversity, challenging traditional norms and encouraging viewers to embrace different family structures as equally valid and loving.

=== Masculinity and fatherhood ===
The show has also been praised for portrayal of masculinity and fatherhood. In a 2016 review, journalist Tim Dowling notes that "one of the main complaints voiced by so-called men's rights activists is that in popular culture husbands and fathers are routinely portrayed as moronic incompetents ... More sensible men's advocates, meanwhile, maintain that men are still straitjacketed by old expectations, and given no room to express vulnerability, doubt, or any emotion besides anger. Masculinity, it seems, just doesn't furnish the modern male with very many acceptable ways to be." While Dowling goes on to address the show's portrayal of Phil as the most "subversive" of the four fathers, the characters of Jay, Cam, and Mitchell also contribute to a mediated understanding of fatherhood that legitimizes a variety of "acceptable ways to be" a modern father. Through the vehicle of comedy, which exposes each of the characters' best and worst qualities, viewers can both witness and interrogate the qualities of the "traditional dad" and the "new dad", a distinction that emerges quite clearly as a new generation of men take the parenting reins from their own fathers.

=== Depiction of Los Angeles ===
In a 2014 article in Slate, the site's podcast executive producer, Andy Bowers, a resident of Los Angeles' Westside, where the show films most of its exteriors, praised the series for its realistic depiction of life in that part of the city.

== Release ==
=== Broadcast ===
Modern Family was picked up for syndication by USA Network for $1.5 million per episode, along with being offered in local syndication at the same time, with Fox Television Stations the lead station group picking up the series. It is also shown on Sky Comedy and E4 in the United Kingdom, e.tv in South Africa, Fox in Sweden, yes Comedy in Israel and Star World in India. The series aired on Citytv in Canada for its first ten seasons. The network additionally obtained the syndicated strip-rights to the show when they became available. Subsequently, it moved to Global for its eleventh and final season. Modern Family moved to E! in Fall 2021 until September 6, 2024, and it began airing on TBS since September 25, 2023, it was also aired on TLC around August 2025 until they removed around July and September 2026, it was picked up by Nickelodeon for its Nick at Nite block, starting on September 10, 2024 until it removed on August 31, 2026 . As of 2025, Modern Family is streaming on Peacock and Hulu.

=== Home media ===
As of 2017, Modern Family had earned $72,226,621 from its domestic home media releases. The series was made available for streaming on Hulu and Peacock in its entirety on February 3, 2021. Internationally, it was released on Disney+.

== Reception ==
=== Ratings ===
Since its premiere, the series has remained popular. In its first season, the show became the sixth-highest rated scripted show in America and the third-highest rated new show. Aided by winning the Primetime Emmy Award for Outstanding Comedy Series, the show's second season became the highest rated show on Wednesday during premiere week. The show also rose 34% from the previous season among adults between the ages of 18 and 49. The show frequently ranked as television's top scripted series in adults 18–49 as well.

The success of the show has been positively compared to The Cosby Show. During the 2010–2011 season, Modern Family was the highest rated scripted show in the 18–49 demographic, and the third-highest rated overall sitcom behind CBS's The Big Bang Theory and Two and a Half Men. The season also ranked first among DVR viewers.

The third-season premiere became ABC's top-rated season premiere in six years. The series' success in ratings has also led it to being credited for reviving sitcoms.

In 2016, a New York Times study of the 50 TV shows with the most Facebook likes found that Modern Family's "audience pattern is the prototypical example of a city show — most popular in liberal, urban clusters in Boston, San Francisco, and Santa Barbara, California, and least popular in the more rural parts of Kentucky, Mississippi, and Arkansas".

Each U.S. network television season starts in late September and ends in late May, which coincides with the completion of May sweeps.

Viewership and ratings per season of Modern Family
Season	Timeslot (ET)	Episodes	First aired		Last aired		TV season	Viewership rank	Avg. viewers (millions)	18–49 rank	Avg. 18–49 rating
Season	Timeslot (ET)	Episodes	Date	Viewers (millions)	Date	Viewers (millions)	TV season	Viewership rank	Avg. viewers (millions)	18–49 rank	Avg. 18–49 rating
1	Wednesday 9:00 p.m.	24	September 23, 2009	12.61	May 19, 2010	10.14	2009–10	36	9.49	21	3.9
2	Wednesday 9:00 p.m.	24	September 22, 2010	12.67	May 25, 2011	10.31	2010–11	24	11.76	5	4.8
3	Wednesday 9:00 p.m.	24	September 21, 2011	14.53	May 23, 2012	10.07	2011–12	15	12.93	4	5.5
4	Wednesday 9:00 p.m.	24	September 26, 2012	14.44	May 22, 2013	10.01	2012–13	16	12.31	7	4.9
5	Wednesday 9:00 p.m.	24	September 25, 2013	11.68	May 21, 2014	10.45	2013–14	19	11.79	5	4.6
6	Wednesday 9:00 p.m.	24	September 24, 2014	11.38	May 20, 2015	7.20	2014–15	24	11.91	8	4.3
7	Wednesday 9:00 p.m.	22	September 23, 2015	9.46	May 18, 2016	6.79	2015–16	36	9.83	10	3.4
8	Wednesday 9:00 p.m.	22	September 21, 2016	8.24	May 17, 2017	6.20	2016–17	34	8.79	12	2.9
9	Wednesday 9:00 p.m.	22	September 27, 2017	7.01	May 16, 2018	5.02	2017–18	58	7.09	21	2.2
10	Wednesday 9:00 p.m.	22	September 26, 2018	5.40	May 8, 2019	4.41	2018–19	65	6.40	25	1.9
11	Wednesday 9:00 p.m.	18	September 25, 2019	4.09	April 8, 2020	7.37	2019–20	48	7.10	11	1.9

Following its release on streaming platforms, Modern Family experienced a resurgence in popularity. Market research company Parrot Analytics, which examines consumer engagement across streaming, downloads, and social media, reported that the series has experienced a notable increase in interest since its debut on Hulu and Peacock in 2021. Streaming analytics firm FlixPatrol, which monitors daily updated VOD charts and streaming ratings across the globe, reported that it was the fifth most-streamed show on Disney+ worldwide in 2022, rising to second place in 2023 behind Grey's Anatomy. In 2024, Parrot Analytics listed Modern Family among the 40 most in-demand TV shows worldwide between January 1 and August 8, noting that while most of the top ten shows appealed to viewers aged 15–31, Modern Family attracted primarily Millennial and Gen X audiences (ages 32–42+). In October 2024, FlixPatrol again reported Modern Family as the second most-watched show on Disney+ worldwide, behind Grey's Anatomy. As of August 5, 2025, the series ranked fifth on Disney+, and by early October 2025, it ranked eighth among the platform's most-viewed shows globally.

Nielsen Media Research, which records streaming viewership on U.S. television screens, announced that Modern Family was watched for 687 million minutes in the U.S. from August 12–18, 2024, making it the seventh most-streamed acquired series that week. In December 2025, Disney announced that it was among the television series to surpass one billion hours streamed on Disney+ in 2025. During the first half of 2026, Modern Family recorded 9.77 billion minutes of watch time, ranking nineteenth among the most-streamed acquired series, according to Nielsen Media Research.

=== Critical response ===
==== Season 1 ====
The first season was met with critical acclaim. It scored 100%, based on 28 reviews, on review aggregator website Rotten Tomatoes, with an average rating of 8.55/10 and the critical consensus: "Thanks to sharp writing and an eccentric but exceedingly likeable cast of characters, Modern Family signals the triumphant return of the family comedy." The first season also scored 86/100, based on 27 reviews, on review aggregator website Metacritic, indicating "universal acclaim".

Entertainment Weekly gave it an A−, calling it "immediately recognizable as the best new sitcom of the fall." In Time's review, the show was named "the funniest new family comedy of the year." It has also been compared to the 1970s series Soap because of the multiple-family aspect. Some have made comparisons to The Office and Parks and Recreation because of their mockumentary formats. BuddyTV named the show the second best show in 2009, saying, "Every actor is fantastic, every family is interesting, and unlike many shows, there isn't a weak link." Robert Canning of IGN gave the season an 8.9 calling it "Great" and saying "Simply put, Modern Family was one of the best new comedies of the season." He also praised the ensemble cast and the characters, calling them lovable. According to Metacritic, the first season was the best reviewed new broadcast television series.

Modern Family drew criticism from the LGBT community for its portrayal of Cameron and Mitchell as not being physically affectionate with each other. The criticism spawned a Facebook campaign to demand that Mitchell and Cameron be allowed to kiss. In response to the controversy, producers released a statement that a season two episode would address Mitchell's discomfort with public displays of affection. Executive producer Levitan has said that it was unfortunate that the issue had arisen, since the show's writers had always planned on such a scene "as part of the natural development of the show." The episode "The Kiss" eventually aired with the kiss scene in the background, which drew praise from multiple critics.

==== Season 2 ====
The show's second season received mostly positive reviews from critics. Season two has a rating of 88% on Rotten Tomatoes based on 16 reviews, with an average score of 8.11/10 and the consensus: "Modern Family's sophomore season sings with ingenious sitcom structure and an ensemble in perfect comedic harmony – even if the tunes are a little familiar". Robert Bianco of USA Today gave the second season four out of four stars, saying "Not since Frasier has a sitcom offered such an ideal blend of heart and smarts, or proven itself so effortlessly adept at so many comic variations, from subtle wordplay to big-laugh slapstick to everything in between." In a later review Bianco stated "as good as it was in its first year, is even better in its second", positively comparing the characters to the characters from The Mary Tyler Moore Show, The Cosby Show, and Friends. During the second season, Adweek named the show one of the 100 Most Influential TV Shows (98th chronologically). Despite this, some critics were less favorable toward the season and described it as a sophomore slump. Eric Stonestreet's acting was widely praised throughout the first season, but criticized during season two for being too contrived and "over-the-top"; Alan Sepinwall called Cameron Tucker a "whiny, overly-sensitive diva". On the other hand, the praise for Ty Burrell's performance (as Phil Dunphy) continued.

==== Season 3 ====
The third season was met with critical acclaim. On Rotten Tomatoes, season three has a rating of 92% based on 13 reviews, with an average score of 8.33/10 and the consensus: "Modern Family settles into a well-oiled groove, consistently delivering inspired farce and making it look effortless." Slant Magazine reviewer Peter Swanson wrote that while the first episode was "the type of wacky-location stunt that's usually reserved for the fifth or sixth season of a dying sitcom," the following episodes "have been better... but they're still uneven". He also criticized the writers for relying too much on "stunt episodes and celebrity cameos, like David Cross". He ultimately gave the season 3 out of 4 stars. James Parker of The Atlantic said, at the beginning of the third season that "Modern Family is very, very funny, almost ruthlessly so. It's a bit of a master class in pace and brevity. The writing is Vorsprung durch Technik: hectically compressed but dramatically elegant, prodigal in its zingers and snorters but austere in its construction." He found it an exception to his dislike for sitcoms that do not use a laugh track. During the third season, New York Times columnist Frank Bruni argued that gay criticism of Cameron and Mitchell actually showed the progress gays have made toward social acceptance. "A decade ago," he wrote, "[gays] would have balked—and balked loudly—at how frequently Cameron in particular tips into limp-wristed, high-voiced caricature." But now, "most gay people trust that the television audience knows we're a diverse tribe, not easily pigeonholed. Modern Family endows us with a sort of comic banality. It's an odd kind of progress. But it's progress nonetheless."

==== Season 4 ====
The fourth season of Modern Family received positive reviews from critics. Rotten Tomatoes gives the season an approval rating of 67% based on 11 reviews, with an average score of 7.75/10 and the consensus: "Modern Family still has charm to burn and boasts a uniformly excellent cast, but the series' subversive edge has dulled". Halfway through the season, Rachel Stein of Television Without Pity wrote, "much as I liked the pairings and some of the dialogue, ["New Year's Eve"] is just another contrived episode of Modern Family we can cite when we talk later about how a different show should have won the 2013 Emmy for Best Comedy." Dalene Rovenstein of Paste Magazine gave the season a positive review, but said a better season was possible.

==== Season 5 ====
The fifth season of Modern Family also received positive reviews. On Rotten Tomatoes, season five has a rating of 90% based on 10 reviews, with an average score of 7.57/10 and the consensus: "Modern Family returns to its conventional roots with grace in a fifth season that delights in providing reliable laughs and rekindles the show's trademark warmth". Reviewing the season's first eight episodes, Matthew Wolfson of Slant Magazine wrote that the show "appear[ed] to have finally arrived at the depressing and predictable low point toward which it [had] been trending for the past two years." He also went on to say that the show had "turned into a shrill pastiche of stereotypical characterizations and superficial banter lacking both feeling and wit", assigning it a rating of 1.5/4 stars. Different writers for The A.V. Club rated, in total, a majority of the former-half episodes with a "B−" grade or less. One writer for the magazine, Joshua Alston, gave "ClosetCon '13" a "C+" and remarked that "Modern Family becomes a high-wire act when it separates its characters into three storylines with no overlap between them." The second half was more warmly received, with three episodes rated an "A−" or higher.

==== Season 6 ====
The show's sixth season received highly positive reviews from TV critics, with some claiming that it was an improvement over the last few seasons. This season has a rating of 100% on Rotten Tomatoes based on 7 reviews, with an average score of 7.67/10. Joshua Alston and Gwen Ihnat of The A.V. Club have awarded the majority of episodes a "B" grade or higher – with particular praise for "The Day We Almost Died" and "Closet? You'll Love It!" – marking an improvement over the repeated "C" grade given throughout the previous season's former half. "Connection Lost" received high critical acclaim, with many praising the episode's writing, originality and "success in transcending what could have been a gimicky episode". In her review for "Closet? You'll Love It!" Gwen Ihnat of The A.V. Club stated that the episode represents "all the reasons why we still watch Modern Family" and awarded the episode an A−. On the same site, David Kallison reviewed "Grill, Interrupted", saying: "This season proves that sitcoms can survive on solid characters and solid jokes."

==== Season 7 ====
The seventh season received positive reviews from critics with many critics calling it similar to the fourth and fifth seasons. On Rotten Tomatoes, this season is rated 67% with 6 reviews and an average rating of 6.5/10. Kyle Fowle from The A.V. Club had a very mixed reaction to the season, only giving one episode an A− or higher. Fowle felt the season was frustrating, believing the season would be defined "by its lack of character progress and overstuffed episodes."

==== Later seasons ====
The series was renewed for a 9th and 10th season on May 10, 2017. Season 9 premiered on September 27, 2017, while season 10 premiered on September 26, 2018.

Seasons 8 and 9 received mixed-to-positive reviews from critics, with main criticisms directed at the lack of character development, overstuffing of episodes, and too many filler episodes per season. While the show continued to be praised for its charm, witty writing, and the cast's performances, criticism grew in these seasons, particularly from reviewers such as those at The A.V. Club.

In January 2018, Christopher Lloyd and Steve Levitan announced that season 10 would most likely be the final season, during the Television Critics Association's winter press tour. However, in August 2018, reports indicated that ABC was in discussions to renew the series for a potential eleventh season.

Season 10 received positive reviews from critics, citing the season as a significant improvement over the last two. The series was praised for its tackling of Haley's pregnancy, the humor of Mitch and Cam looking after Cal, and its dealing with change in a positive way. Episodes "Torn Between Two Lovers", "Good Grief", and "A Year Of Birthdays" were particularly praised.

The series was renewed for an eleventh season on January 7, 2019, which was confirmed as the final season on February 5. The last season premiered on September 25, 2019, and aired its last episode on April 8, 2020.

Season 11 similarly received positive reviews. The season was praised for its themes of change and ending, and the improved humor upon the last seasons, with particular attention to episodes "The Prescott", "Legacy", "Spuds" and "Finale".

=== Accolades ===
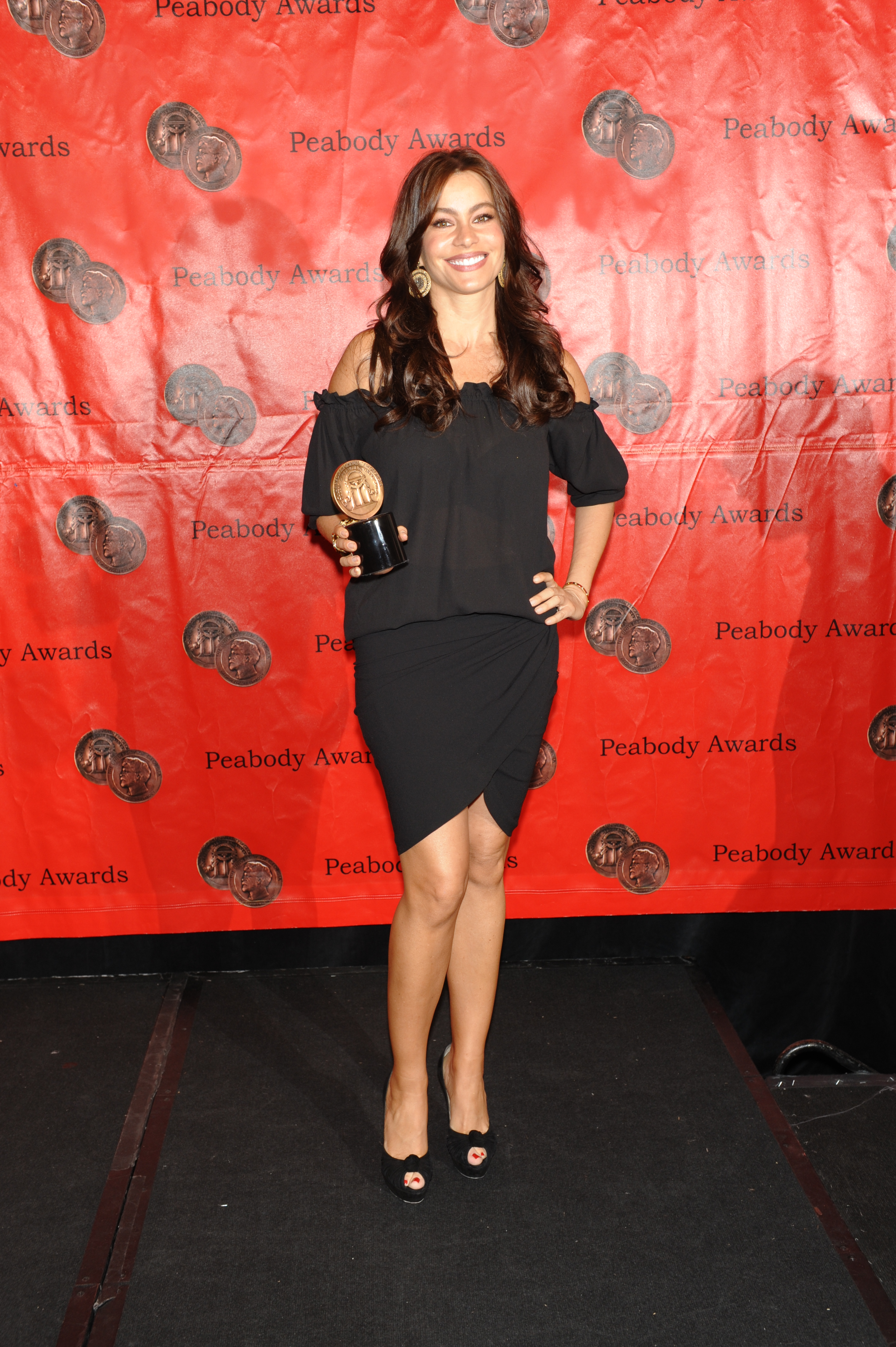
Sofía Vergara with the award for Modern Family at the 69th Annual Peabody Awards

Modern Family has won 22 Primetime Emmy Awards and 6 Writers Guild of America Awards. The show also later received a GLSEN Respect Award for its portrayal of "positive images and storylines that reflect a diverse America, including the depiction of a family headed by a gay couple." In 2010, Modern Family was nominated for five Television Critics Association Awards. To reinforce the idea of an ensemble cast, the cast all submitted themselves in the Supporting Actor and Actress categories instead of Lead Actor and Actress for the 62nd Primetime Emmy Awards. The series has also been put on multiple critics' lists. In 2010, the series was listed 2nd on Time's Top Ten Best Shows of 2009, 2nd on BuddyTV's Top Ten Best Shows of 2009, Jason Hughes Best TV of 2009, Modern Family was awarded a Peabody Award in 2009. In 2012, the show won the Golden Globe Award for Best Television Series – Musical or Comedy and was nominated for a British Academy Television Award. Every season of the show was also named one of the top 10 TV seasons of the year (from 2009 to 2012) by the American Film Institute.

During the 2012 US presidential election, both First Lady Michelle Obama, in an interview with Kal Penn at the 2012 Democratic National Convention, and Ann Romney, in an interview with The Insider, cited Modern Family as their favorite TV show.

In June 2013, the Writers Guild of America ranked Modern Family number 34 on a list of the 101 most well-written television series ever made. In December 2013, TV Guide ranked it number 43 on its list of the 60 Best Series of all time.

==== Emmy Awards received by cast ====
The following is a list of Emmy nominations received by the cast of the series. Wins are highlighted in boldface.

- Ed O'Neill earned three consecutive nominations for Outstanding Supporting Actor in a Comedy Series in 2011, 2012 and 2013.
- Sofía Vergara earned four consecutive nominations for Outstanding Supporting Actress in a Comedy Series in 2010, 2011, 2012 and 2013.
- Julie Bowen earned six consecutive nominations for Outstanding Supporting Actress in a Comedy Series in 2010, **2011**, **2012**, 2013, 2014 and 2015.
- Ty Burrell, the most nominated actor in the series, received eight consecutive nominations for Outstanding Supporting Actor in a Comedy Series in 2010, **2011**, 2012, 2013, **2014**, 2015, 2016 and 2017.
- Jesse Tyler Ferguson received five consecutive nominations for Outstanding Supporting Actor in a Comedy Series in 2010, 2011, 2012, 2013 and 2014.
- Eric Stonestreet received three consecutive nominations for Outstanding Supporting Actor in a Comedy Series in **2010**, 2011 and **2012**.
- Nathan Lane received three nominations for Outstanding Guest Actor in a Comedy Series in 2011, 2013 and 2014.
- Fred Willard received two nominations for Outstanding Guest Actor in a Comedy Series in 2011 and 2020.
- Greg Kinnear was nominated for Outstanding Guest Actor in a Comedy Series in 2012.
- Elizabeth Banks was nominated for Outstanding Guest Actress in a Comedy Series in 2015.

=== Criticism ===
Michelle Haimoff of the Christian Science Monitor criticized the show during its third season for only casting the women as stay-at-home moms while the husbands have highly successful careers: "There is a difference between quirky, flawed characters and ones who are incapable of professional success. And when the latter is reliably female, it makes for sexist television. It also makes for unrealistic television." Late Night with Jimmy Fallon writer Ali Waller asked her Twitter followers in 2013 "If Modern Family is so 'modern' then why don't any of the women have jobs?" Other authors reinforced this criticism, claiming that stay-at-home mothers are no longer the norm in modern society. Claire later went to work in season five.

According to a CNET staffer commenting on a first-season episode: "The wife and daughter are unable to learn how to use the remote and must be taught by the father, while the son is 'good with electronics,' even though he is thought of as the stupidest member of the family." Arianna Reiche from Gawker commented on the episode "Game Changer" in which Gloria hides her skill at chess so her husband will not be upset at losing: "This moment is at best a sappy quip about compromise in an often heavy-handed series, and at worst, it's a moment in a show with 9.3 million viewers, on a network owned by Disney, which explicitly validates girls and women subduing their intellect."

== Impact ==
=== Analysis ===
Several analyses have credited the show with improving attitudes towards gay individuals and normalizing same-sex marriage within American society. Across both Canada and Italy, individuals who watched Modern Family held more favorable beliefs about same gender parenting, fewer perceived problems, and less desire for social distance from same gender parents. For people with more religious beliefs, Modern Family reduced prejudice in Canada. In Italy, most people had never interacted with same gender parents, so Modern Family acted as a first exposure. The show offered a non threatening portrayal and a positive example that showed parents who are loving. Modern Family also used humor to present same-sex parenting in a relatable way.

An article by Haji and Fasoli talks about the influence of Modern Family. The article looked at if exposure to Modern Family, specifically the same gender adoptive parents, would change attitudes towards same gender parenting. The authors found that watching Modern Family—and the LGBTQ+ characters within the show—can reduce prejudice and increase acceptance towards same gender parents. The study found that when queer families are portrayed as "normal" through the lens of a sitcom, people are more likely to support same-gender parenting. The study also found that media can act as a unit of change.

=== In popular culture ===
- In the first episode of the sixteenth season of Family Guy, titled "Emmy-Winning Episode," Modern Family is parodied along with other series. The characters of Family Guy attempt to win an Emmy by mimicking popular shows, including Modern Family. Actresses Julie Bowen and Sofia Vergara also lend their voices as guest characters, while actor Ty Burrell appears in a live action scene.
- In the seventh episode of WandaVision, titled "Breaking the Fourth Wall," the sitcom elements serve as a tribute to Modern Family. The episode reflects the setting, aesthetic, and mockumentary format of Modern Family, including a title card that closely resembles that of the original series. It also mirrors Modern Family by using brief flashbacks, notably during Wanda Maximoff's reference to the previous night's events. Jacob Sarkisian of Business Insider remarked that Elizabeth Olsen channeled Julie Bowen's Claire Dunphy in her portrayal of Maximoff, closely resembling her and emulating her hand gestures and vocal intonations Actress Julie Bowen expressed her gratitude on Instagram for the homage to Modern Family. Her post included two images: one of a television paused on the WandaVision title sequence, which mimics the font and format of Modern Family, and another of Wanda Maximoff staring deadpan at the camera, reminiscent of Bowen's portrayal of Claire Dunphy. In her caption, Bowen conveyed her surprise and appreciation, extending her thanks to Marvel for the reference.

== Other media ==
=== Adaptations ===
- Chile: MEGA was the first in the world to buy the rights of Modern Family to produce their own version of the series, with the title Familia moderna, which premiered on December 3, 2015. One difference in this is Mitchell and Cameron's counterparts in this version do not adopt, but instead one of them is the biological father of the child as a result of a drunken fling. They take custody of the child while the mother travels overseas.
- Greece: Mega Channel bought the rights of Modern Family for Greece and Cyprus and announced a Greek language adaptation, under the name Moderna Oikogeneia, which premiered on March 20, 2014.
- Iran: The Islamic Republic of Iran Broadcasting produced a scene-by-scene remake of Modern Family, titled Haft Sang which premiered on June 30, 2014. However, in this version the same-sex relationship between Cam and Mitchell of the original series was replaced by a heterosexual relationship. Also, Haley Dunphy's character is replaced by a teenage boy. Due to this change, Haley's boyfriend Dylan is replaced by a close friend of the teenage boy.

=== Cancelled spinoffs ===
In early 2013, a spin-off series centered around Rob Riggle's character Gil Thorpe was revealed to be in early stages of development.

In June 2020, ABC Entertainment president Karey Burke discussed a spin-off of Modern Family centered around Mitch and Cam, inspired by an idea from series co-creator and executive producer, Steven Levitan. In June 2022, star Jesse Tyler Ferguson confirmed that the script for the show's spinoff is completed. "The script's out there and it's very good. So you know, who knows? If someone wants to produce it, maybe." In September 2024, Eric Stonestreet stated that the spin-off "[isn't] potential anymore" and that the time to produce it has passed, despite believing that the series would have been a "slam dunk".
