= Strawberry pie =

Dessert of strawberries in a pie crust

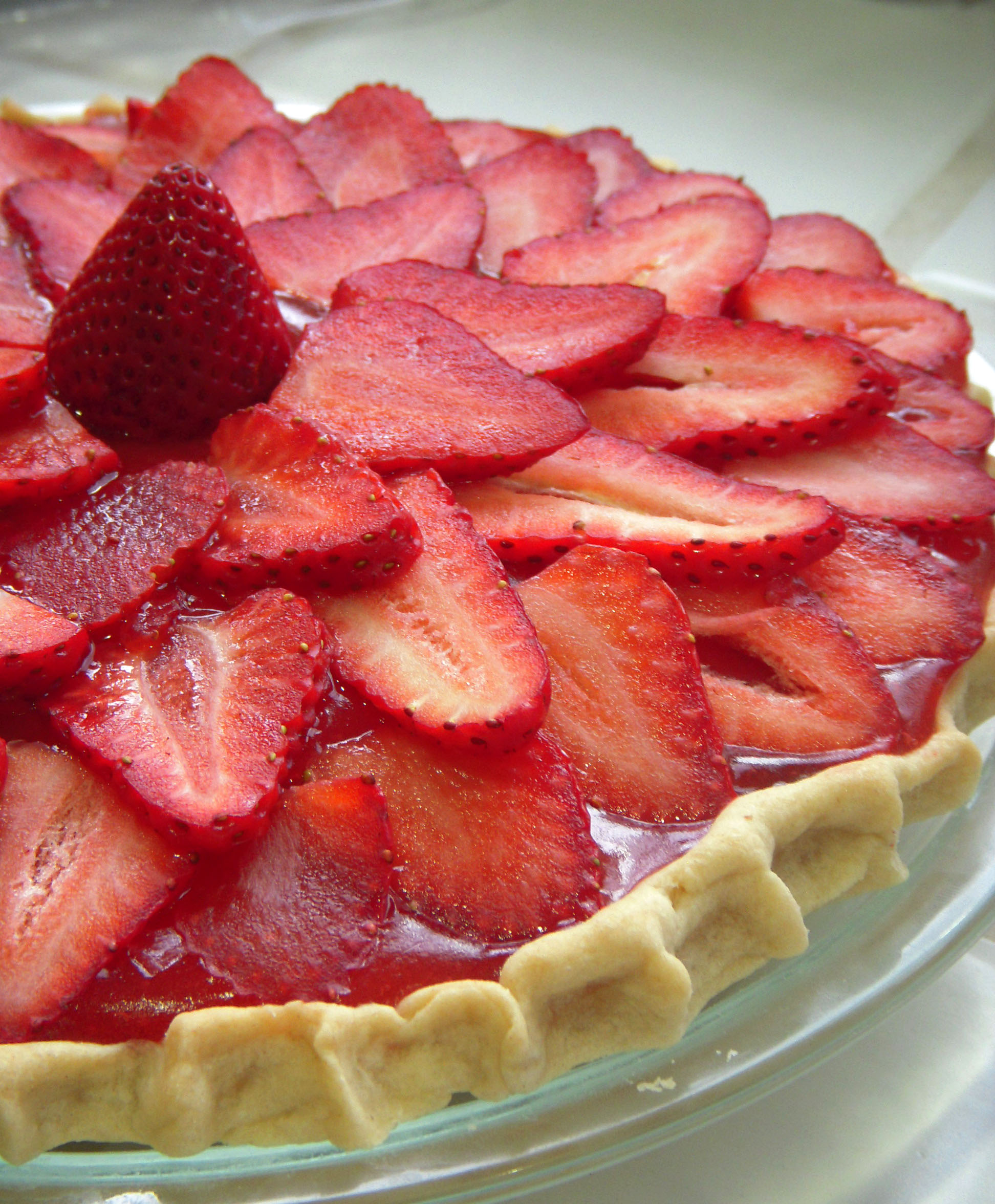
- Fresh strawberry pie
- Type: Fruit pie
- Course: Dessert
- Main ingredients: Pie crust, strawberries, sugar
- Variations: Strawberry-rhubarb pie

Strawberry pie is a dessert food consisting mainly of strawberries and sugar in a pie crust, sometimes with gelatin. It is often served with whipped cream.

== Preparation ==
Fresh strawberry pies are usually made with in-season sweet berries, while out-of-season strawberries are often better suited for baked pies. A double strawberry pie has glazed, uncooked strawberries on top, with a layer of cooked strawberries underneath.

A common concern with strawberry pies is how to prevent the crust from becoming soggy or watery. Possible causes of watery strawberry pies include the thickener, particularly when not enough cornstarch is used, or when it has lost its thickening properties after being cooked for too long. Cutting the strawberries too finely can also contribute to excess moisture in the pie. Sometimes, a layer of cream cheese is added to help keep the pie crust crisp.

== Consumption ==
In the United States, strawberry pie is one of the red foods often served at Juneteenth celebrations. It is also a popular dessert at Fourth of July gatherings.

Strawberry-pie eating contests are part of many summer strawberry festivals across America. At the annual contest in Athens, Georgia, the 2023 winner, Kyle Chesler, ate fourteen slices in two minutes, hands-free.

Each year in May in Huntington, West Virginia, Jim's Steak and Spaghetti House serves over 10,000 slices of strawberry pie for one week only, with thousands of customers lining up outside its doors. Their strawberry pie, which consists of "fresh strawberries layered into a pie shell with confectionery sugar and real whipped cream," has received national recognition from People magazine and the Food Network.

== Related desserts ==
The main difference between a strawberry pie and a strawberry tart is the crust used. Strawberry pies have simple piecrusts and can be made quickly. Strawberry tarts, on the other hand, have a sweet pastry crust resembling a thin butter cookie and take longer to make, with a pastry cream layer that needs to be chilled. Torta de morango is a commonly consumed dessert in Brazil.

A related dessert food is the strawberry-rhubarb pie, a baked pie which has a tendency to become "very juicy" or "soggy," due to the high water content of both the rhubarb and the strawberries.

Some bakers have made strawberry pie with pretzel crust instead of the traditional pastry crust.

== Gallery ==
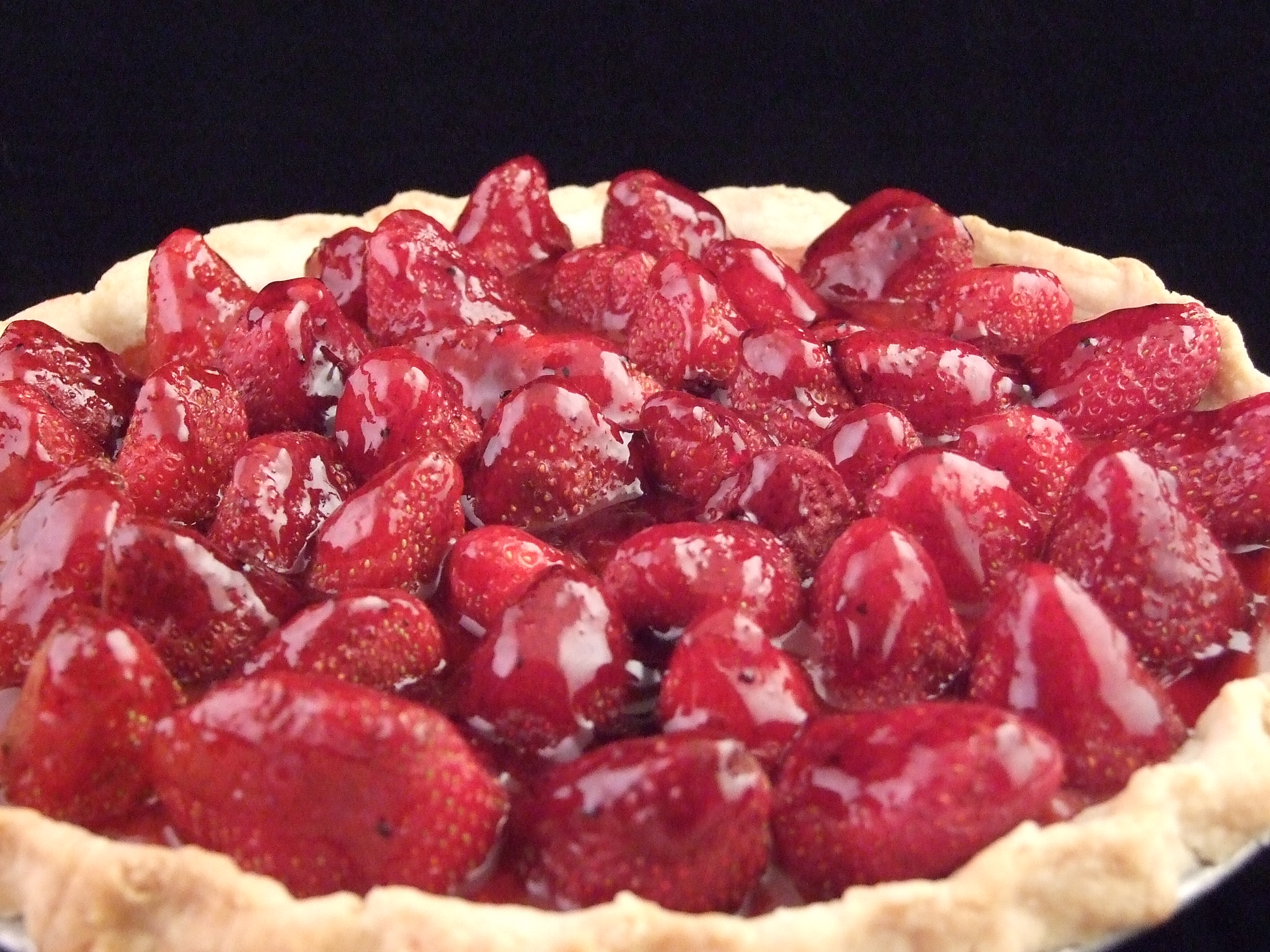
Double strawberry pie

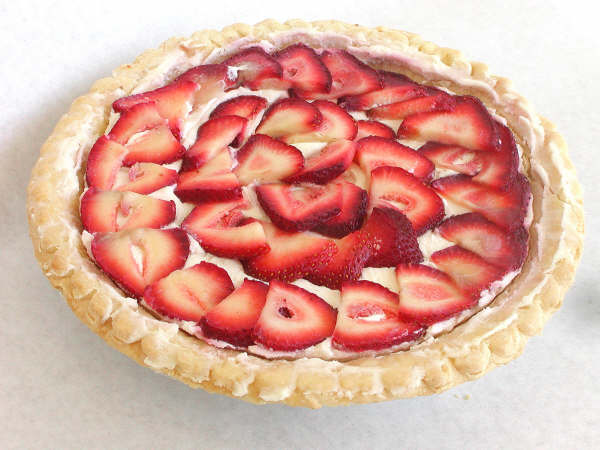
Strawberry cheese pie

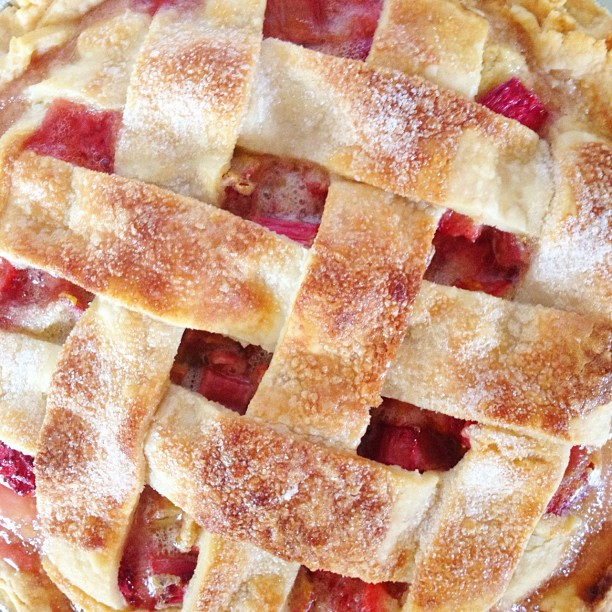
Strawberry rhubarb pie

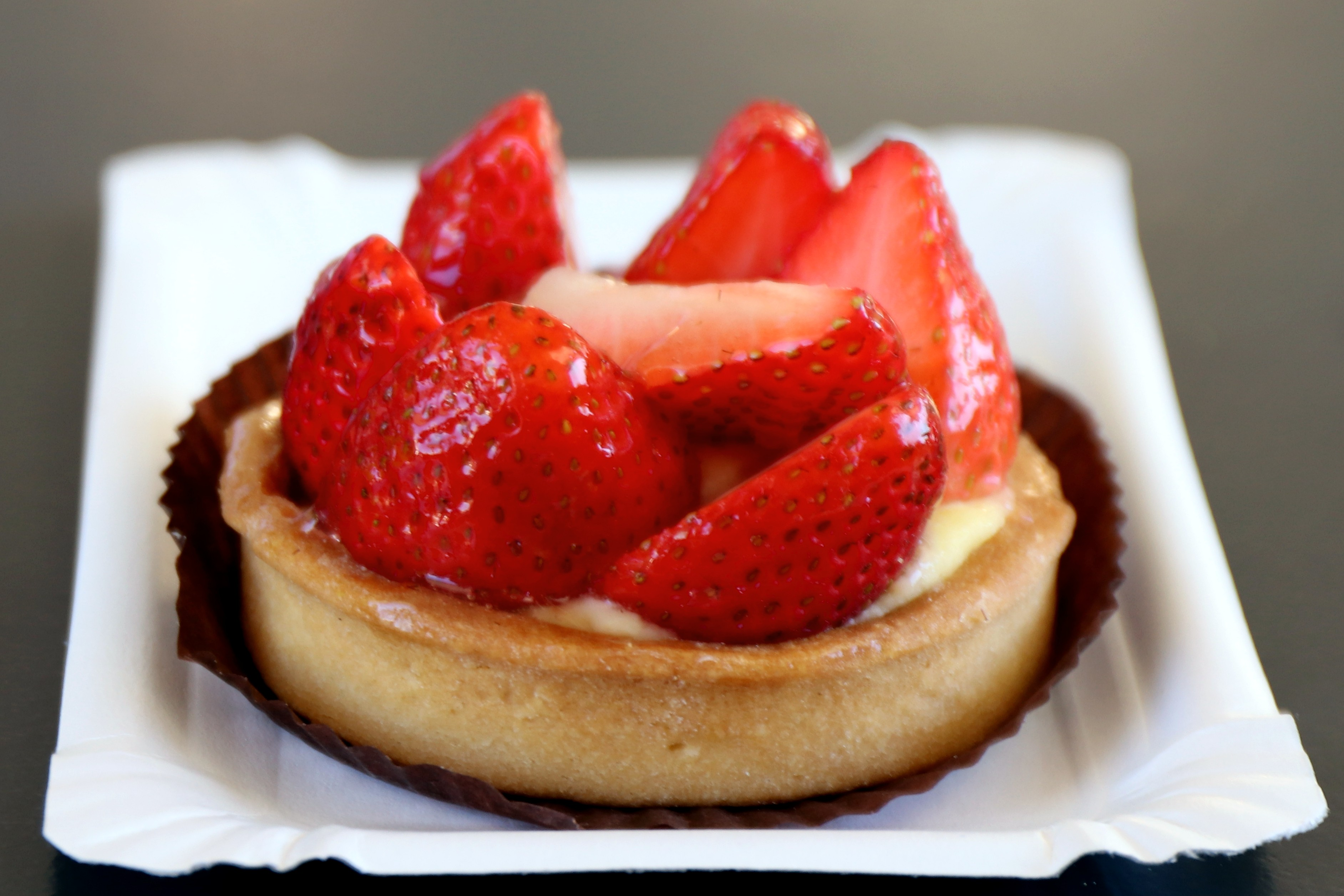
Strawberry tart

== See also ==
- List of strawberry dishes
- Strawberry cake
- Tart
