= Jayne Mansfield–Sophia Loren photo =

1957 photograph

Loren (left) with Mansfield at Romanoff's in Beverly Hills

In 1957, Jayne Mansfield, an American actress and model known for her publicity stunts, attended a dinner in Beverly Hills at the exclusive Romanoff's restaurant hosted by Paramount Pictures to officially welcome Italian actress Sophia Loren to Hollywood. A photograph of the two women, with Loren casting a sideways glance at Mansfield's cleavage, was distributed world-wide and became an international sensation.

== Original incident ==
In April 1957, Italian actress Sophia Loren was being welcomed to Hollywood by Paramount Pictures at a dinner party at Romanoff's restaurant in Beverly Hills. Loren had achieved considerable success in Europe as an actress. She had been the most photographed actor at the 1955 Cannes Film Festival.

During that same year, 20th Century-Fox had begun to market American actress Jayne Mansfield as the studio's "blonde-bombshell" successor to Marilyn Monroe after the success of the film The Girl Can't Help It (1956). Mansfield, herself a successful actress with film and Broadway credits as well as having appeared in Playboy as the Playmate of the Month, was widely known for staging publicity stunts which garnered nationwide attention, such as when her top fell off in a pool while surrounded by journalists.

According to Loren, Mansfield was the last person to arrive to the dinner and walked directly to her table, where she was seated between Loren and her dinner companion Clifton Webb. Mansfield, wearing a backless satin dress in her signature pink color with a deep, plunging neckline, was photographed at the table during the dinner as Loren looks on at her revealing dress. Mansfield's dress, which was worn without a bra, appears to expose one of her nipples in some photos.

== Worldwide publicity ==
Loren was captured in several images staring at Mansfield's exposed breasts. More than one photographer captured the moment; both Delmar Watson and Joe Shere caught Loren casting a glance from the corners of her eyes at Mansfield's bust. The photographs received worldwide attention, appearing in newspapers and magazines with the word "censored" hiding Mansfield's exposed bosom.

== Reaction ==
Fearful of public outrage, most Italian newspapers refused to print the wirephotos; Il Giorno and Gazzetta del Popolo printed them after retouching to cover much of Mansfield's bosom, and only Il Giornale d'Italia printed them uncensored.

In November 2014, Loren described the dinner and incident in an interview with Entertainment Weekly:

"All of cinema was there, it was incredible. And then comes in Jayne Mansfield, the last one to come. For me, that was when it got amazing. She came right for my table. She knew everyone was watching. She sat down. And now, she was barely… Listen. Look at the picture. Where are my eyes? I’m staring at her nipples because I am afraid they are about to come onto my plate. In my face you can see the fear. I’m so frightened that everything in her dress is going to blow—BOOM!—and spill all over the table."

Although Loren is frequently asked to autograph a copy of the photograph, she refuses, preferring to separate herself from the incident instead. "I don’t want to have anything to do with that. And also out of respect for Jayne Mansfield because she’s not with us anymore."

In 2025, Mansfield's daughter, Mariska Hargitay, born seven years after the photograph and three years before Mansfield's death, recounted distaste for the perception of her mother as a "blonde bimbo", being "embarrassed by the choices that [Mansfield] made", and said of the photograph "to see another woman look at your mom like that was excruciating for me as a little girl."

== Homages ==
In 1993, Daniela Federici created a homage with Anna Nicole Smith as Mansfield and New York City DJ Sky Nellor as Loren for a Guess Jeans campaign. In 2002, Mark Seliger took a picture named Heidi Klum at Romanoff's with Heidi Klum in a reproduction of the restaurant set. In 2023, Joe Shere photographed Sydney Sweeney as Mansfield and Maude Apatow as Loren.

This photo was also parodied in the 2014 Modern Family episode "iSpy" with Julie Bowen in Loren's place staring down the chest of Sofia Vergara, who took Mansfield's spot. Jessica Simpson, after claiming Vogue body shamed her in 2020, posted the picture on her social media and said that she felt like Jayne Mansfield. Vogue later apologized to her.
