= Strawberry cake =

Cakes made with strawberries

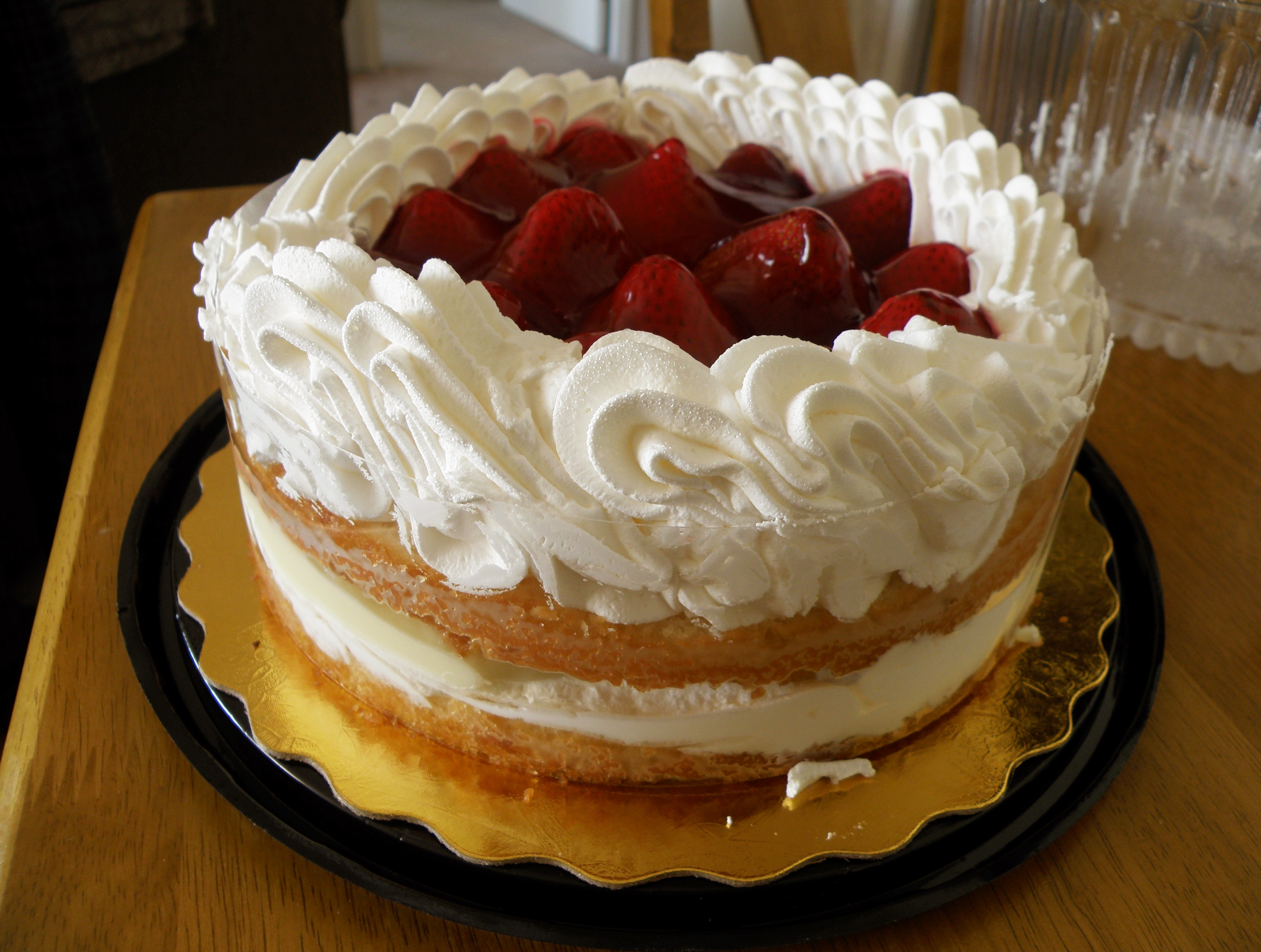
- A strawberry layer cake filled with whipped cream
- Type: Cake
- Course: Dessert, tea, coffee
- Main ingredients: Cake batter, strawberries
- Variations: Strawberry shortcake

Strawberry Cake
Nutritional value per 100 g (3.5 oz)
- Energy: 444 kcal (1,860 kJ)
- Carbohydrates: 64.4 g
- Sugars: 46.7 g
- Dietary fiber: 0 g
- Fat: 11.1 g
- Saturated: 11.1 g
- Trans: 0 g
- Protein: 4.44 g
Vitamins and minerals
Vitamins	Quantity %DV^{†}
Vitamin D	0% 0 μg
Minerals	Quantity %DV^{†}
Calcium	0% 0 mg
Iron	0% 0 mg
Potassium	0% 0 mg
Sodium	6% 133 mg
- Other constituents: Quantity
- Cholesterol: 133 mg
- ^{†}Percentages estimated using US recommendations for adults, except for potassium, which is estimated based on expert recommendation from the National Academies. Source: U.S. Department of Agriculture

Strawberry cake is a cake that uses strawberry as a primary ingredient. Strawberries may be used in the cake batter, atop the cake, and in the frosting. Strawberry cakes are typically served cold.

== Overview ==
Strawberry cakes may be prepared with strawberries in the batter, with strawberries atop them, with strawberries or a strawberry filling in between the layers of a layer cake, and in any combination thereof. Some are prepared with strawberries incorporated into a frosting. Fresh or frozen strawberries may be used. However, using cooked strawberries tends to lose its flavor and turn brown while frozen strawberries are mostly sweeter and riper. Some may utilize strawberry-flavored gelatin as an ingredient, which can give the cake a pink color when it is mixed in with the batter. A garnish of strawberries is used on some strawberry cakes. Strawberry cake may be prepared as a gluten-free dish. The cake can be served with icing on top and sides of the cake.

Some versions are served chilled, and some are frozen and then served in a partially frozen state. Strawberry cake is sometimes prepared using a prepared cake mix as a base, such as a white cake mix, upon which additional ingredients are added to the batter or atop the cake. It is sometimes prepared and served as a dish on Valentine's Day.

== Ingredients ==
Typical ingredients for a strawberry cake are unsalted butter, sugar, eggs, vanilla extract, flour, baking powder, baking soda, salt, and milk. The strawberries can be fresh or frozen. While raspberries or sliced peaches can be used as an alternative, strawberries were the primary ingredient for this cake. For the frosting, Whipped cream can be used or an icing which is made by mixing egg whites and powdered sugar. Other ingredients include Jell-O to maintain its pinkish color of the cake. Also, Ricotta cheese is sometimes used as an ingredient in the cake batter or as a topping.

== Nutrients ==
A 100 gram reference serving of commercially served Strawberry cake has 444 calories, 11% fat, 64% carbohydrates, and 4% protein. The product contains no micronutrients and minerals.

== History ==
In pre-colonial days, Wild strawberries were abundant in North America. Native Americans often ate fresh and dried strawberries. Native Americans would create strawberry bread by mashing wild strawberries and adding cornmeal as a primary ingredient. Around 1607, Strawberry bread became popular with the early settlers. Besides Native Americans, Europeans discovered how wild strawberries are better in North America than in Europe due to its bigger size and its exquisite flavor.

Growth of strawberries marked the end of winter for Native Americans. Europeans have combined their version and created strawberry shortcake.

One of the earliest references of a strawberry cake recipe can be found in the journal Ohio Cultivator in 1845. In 1847, the same recipe appears in the book Lady's Receipt-Book by Eliza Leslie.

== Gallery ==
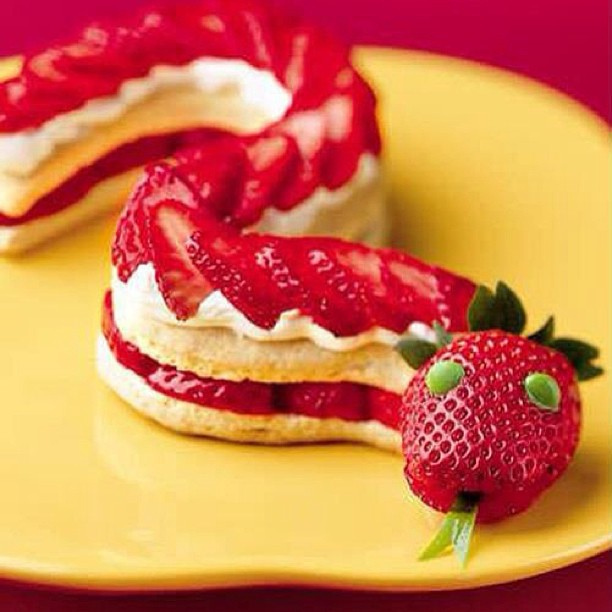
A strawberry cake prepared in the shape of a snake

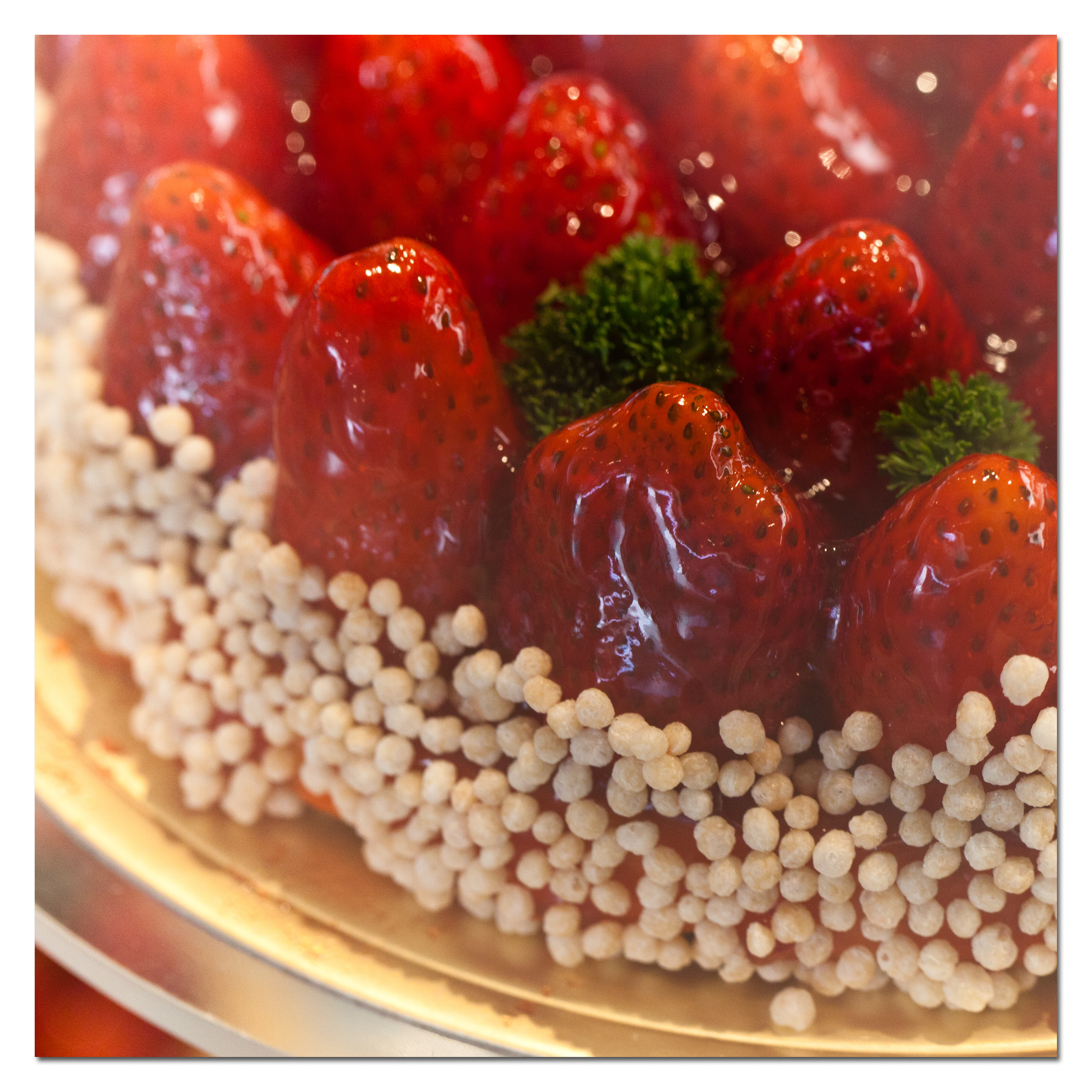
A close-up view of a strawberry cake for Valentine's Day

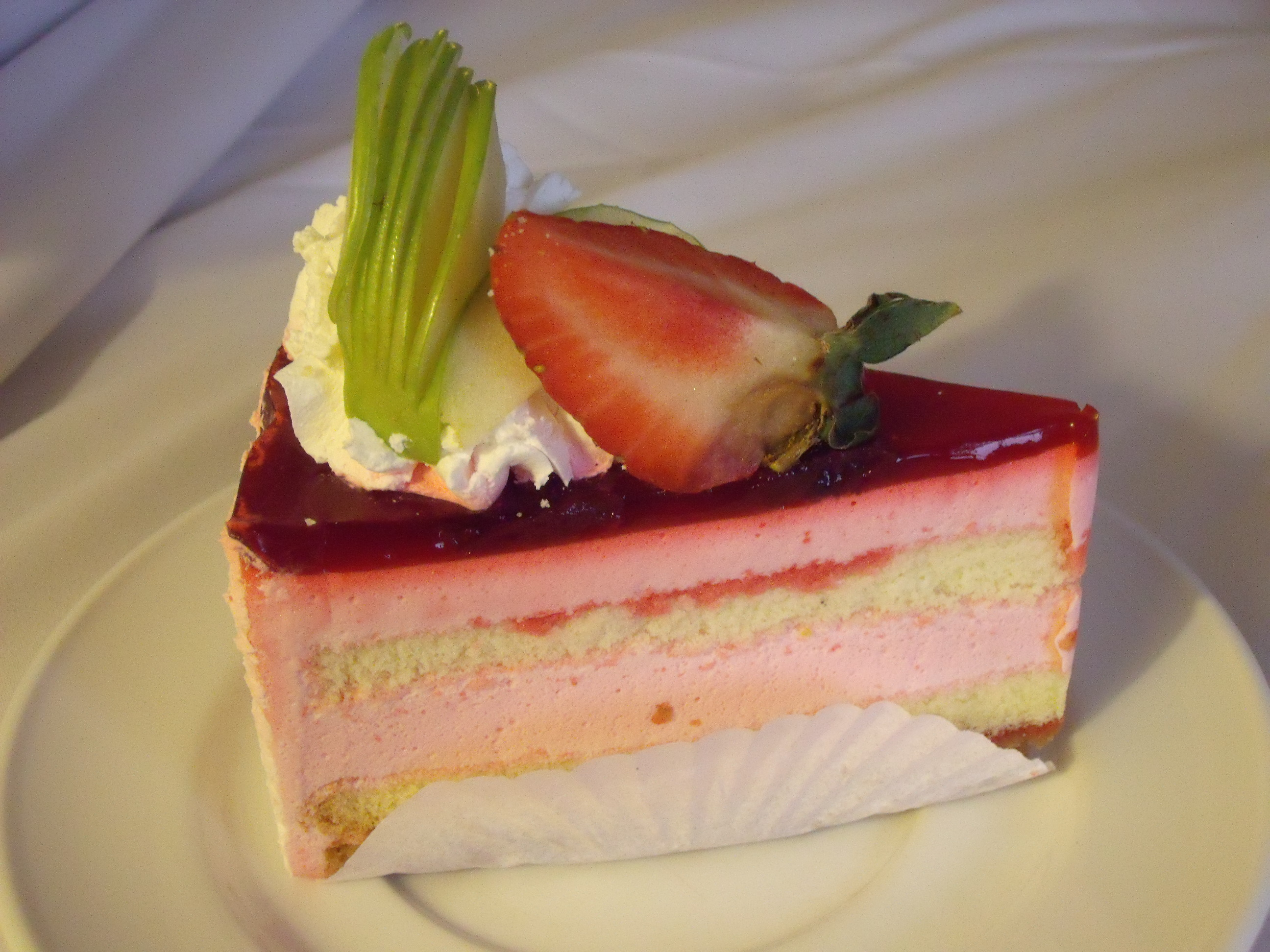
A slice of strawberry cake

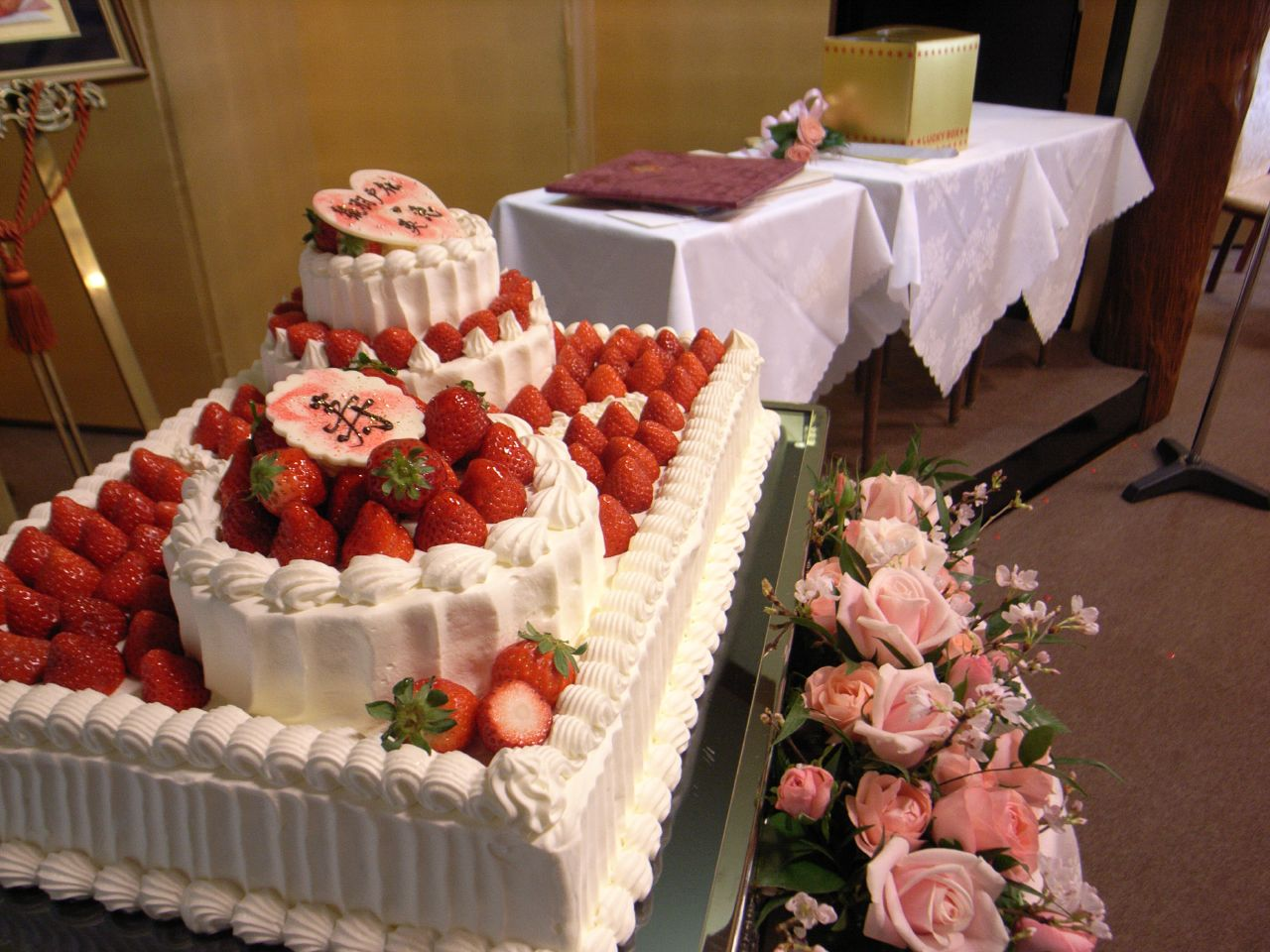
A strawberry wedding cake

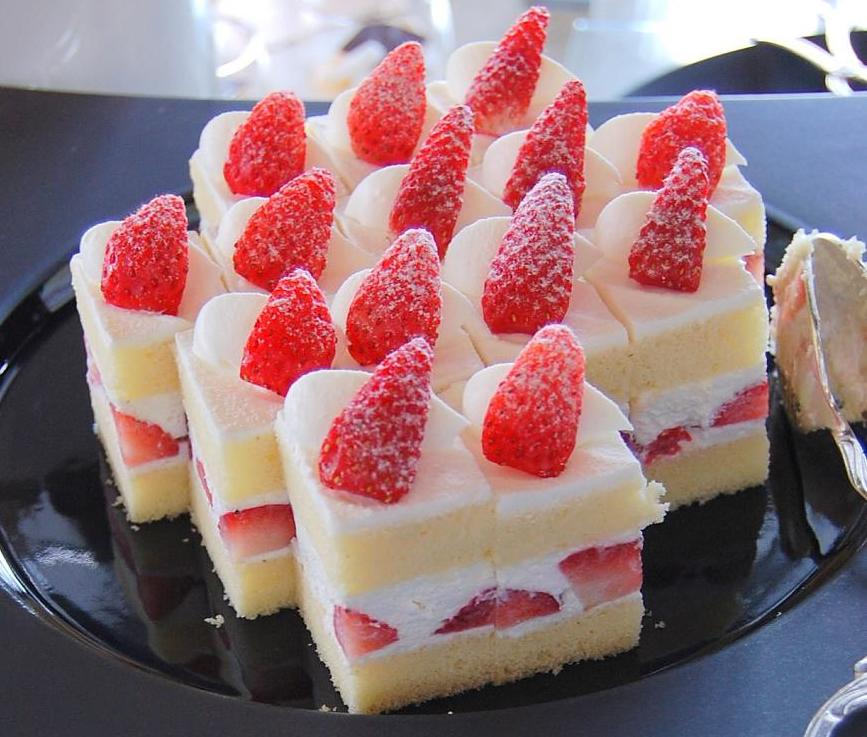
A slice of strawberry cakes in buffet

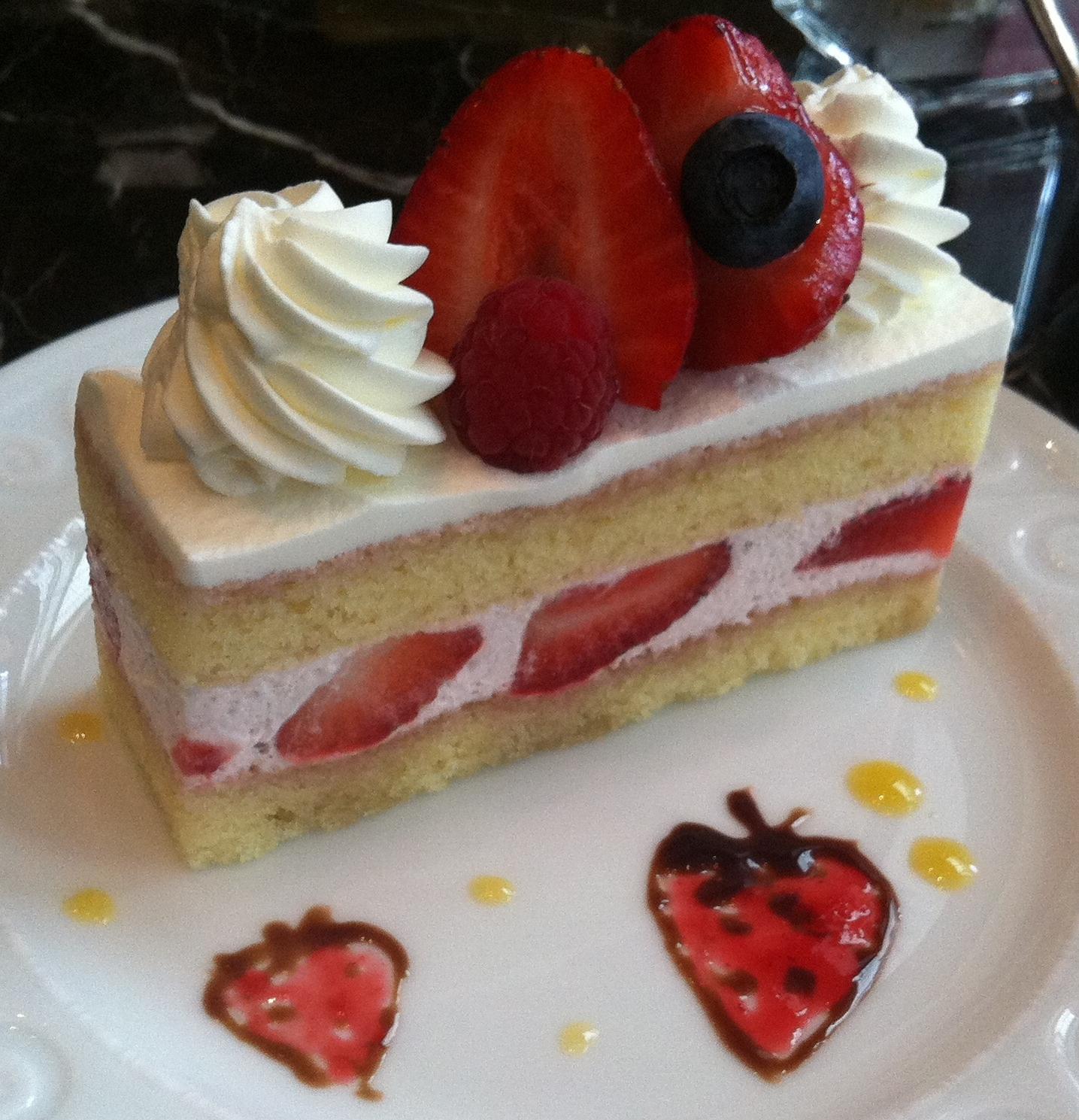
A strawberry layer cake with strawberries in the frosting between the layers and a strawberry garnish

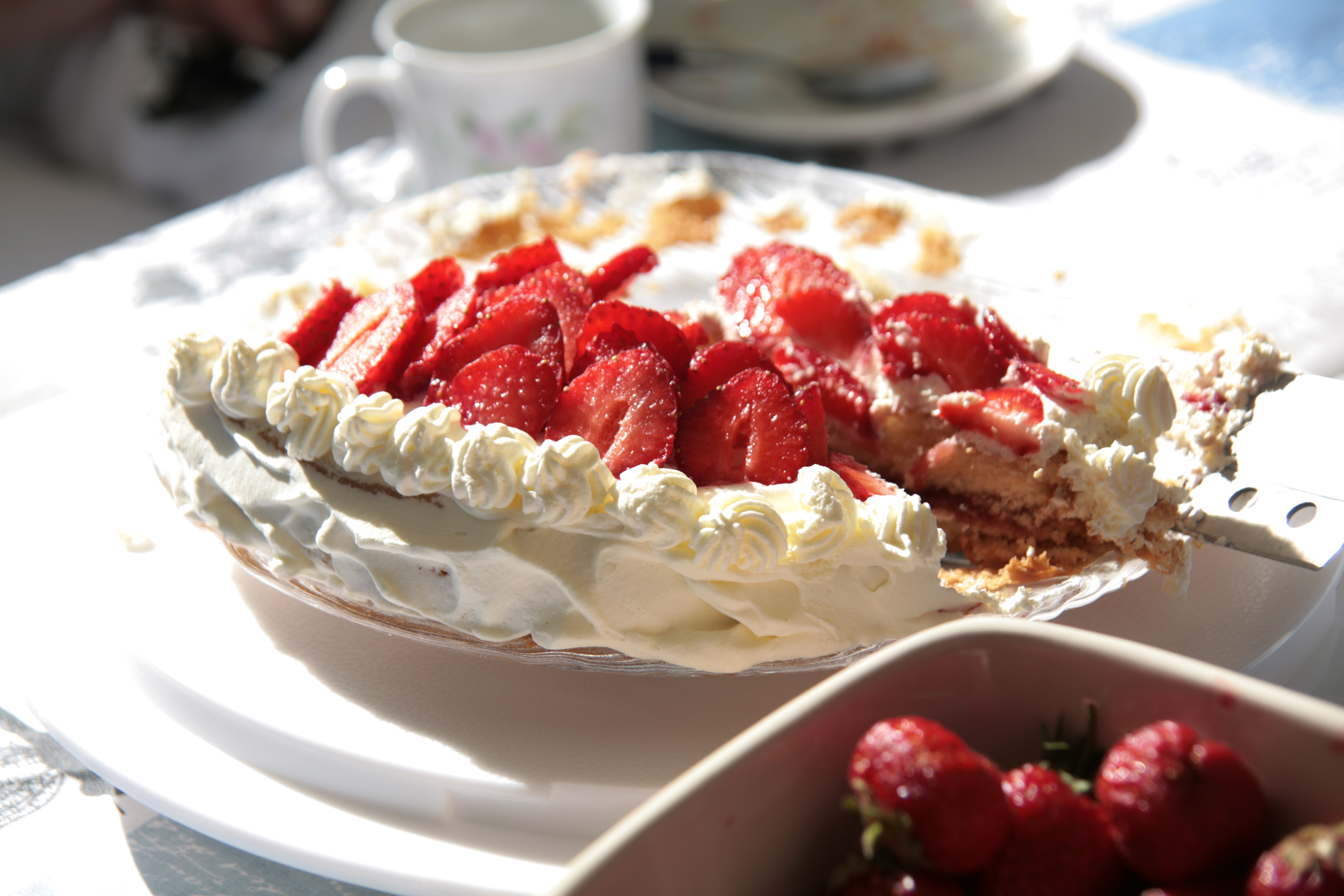
Swedish Midsummer cake with strawberries and cream

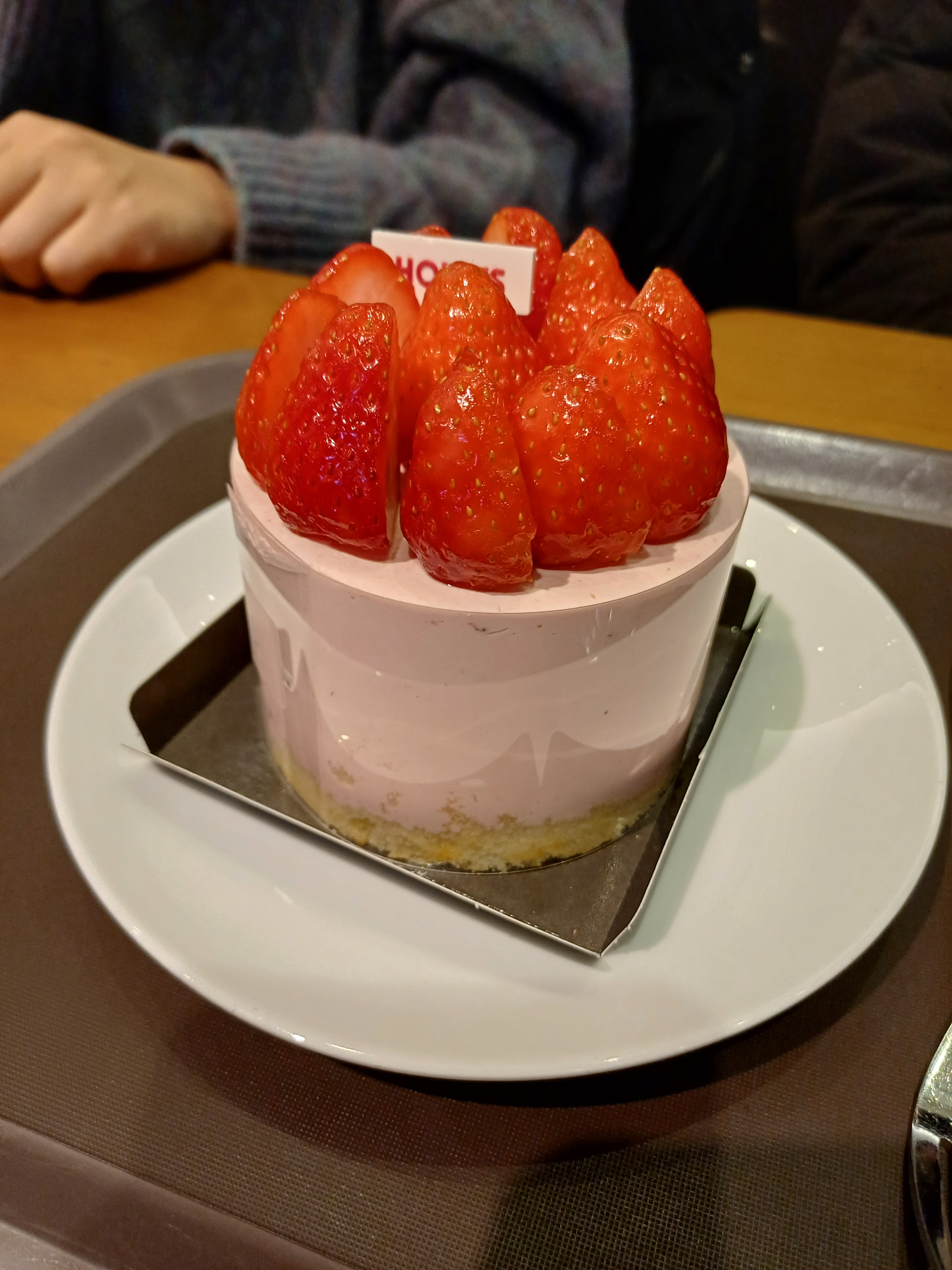
A whole strawberry cake served on a customer table

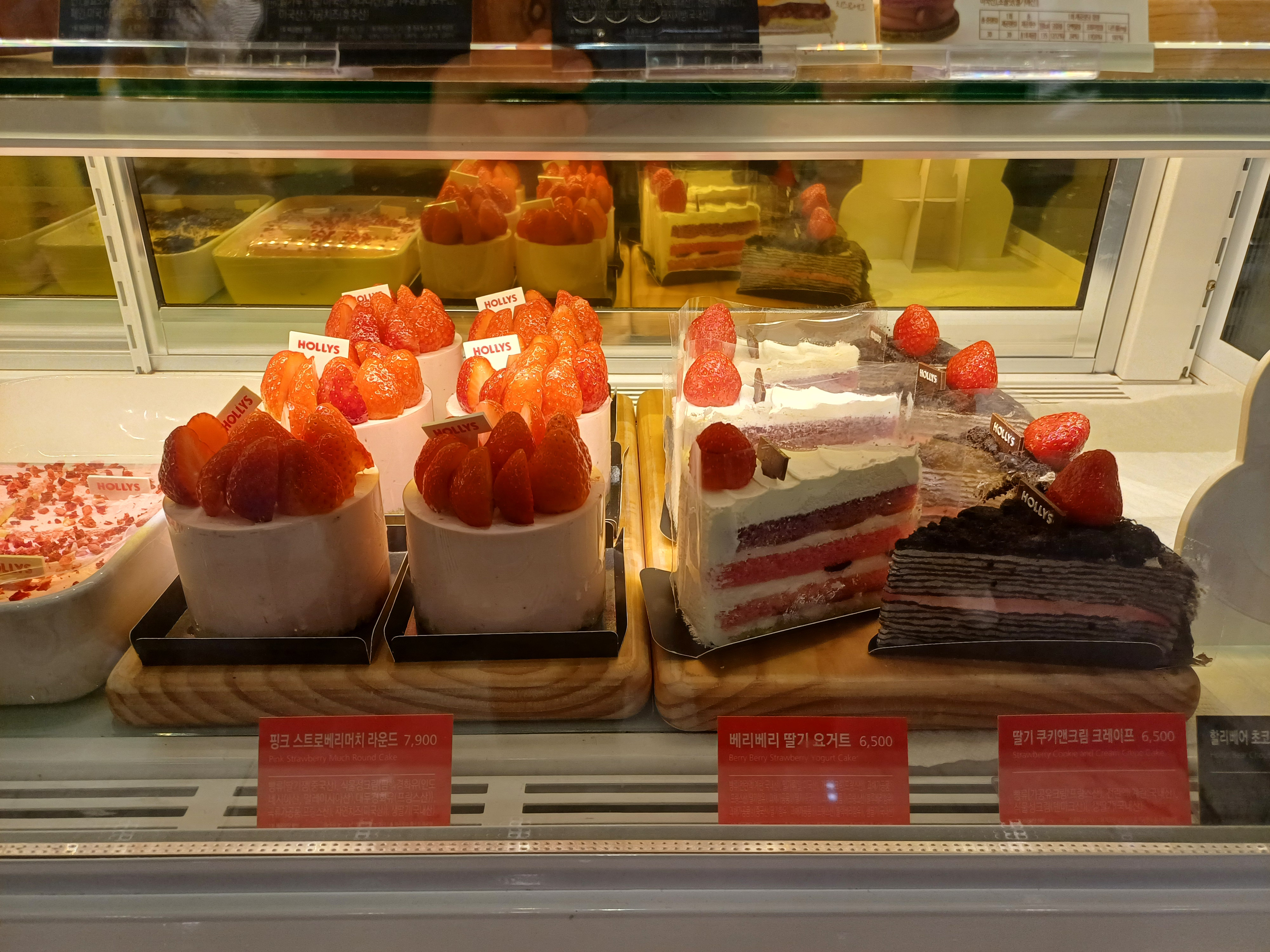
Variety of strawberry cake sold in a cake shop

== Philippines ==
La Trinidad, Benguet Strawberry Festival

On 20 March 2004, at the Strawberry Festival in the La Trinidad, Benguet municipality of the Philippines, the world's largest strawberry shortcake was prepared and confirmed by Guinness World Records. The cake was prepared by several bakers and weighed a total of 21,213.40 lb (9,622.23 kg).

In March 2015 at the La Trinidad Strawberry Festival, 6,000 slices of strawberry cake were served as part of the events. The cakes for the slices were prepared using fresh strawberries. Additional foods served at the event included strawberry cupcakes, strawberry kutsinta (a steamed rice cake) and strawberry wine. Some bakeries and restaurants purvey strawberry cake as a part of their fare.

== Japan ==
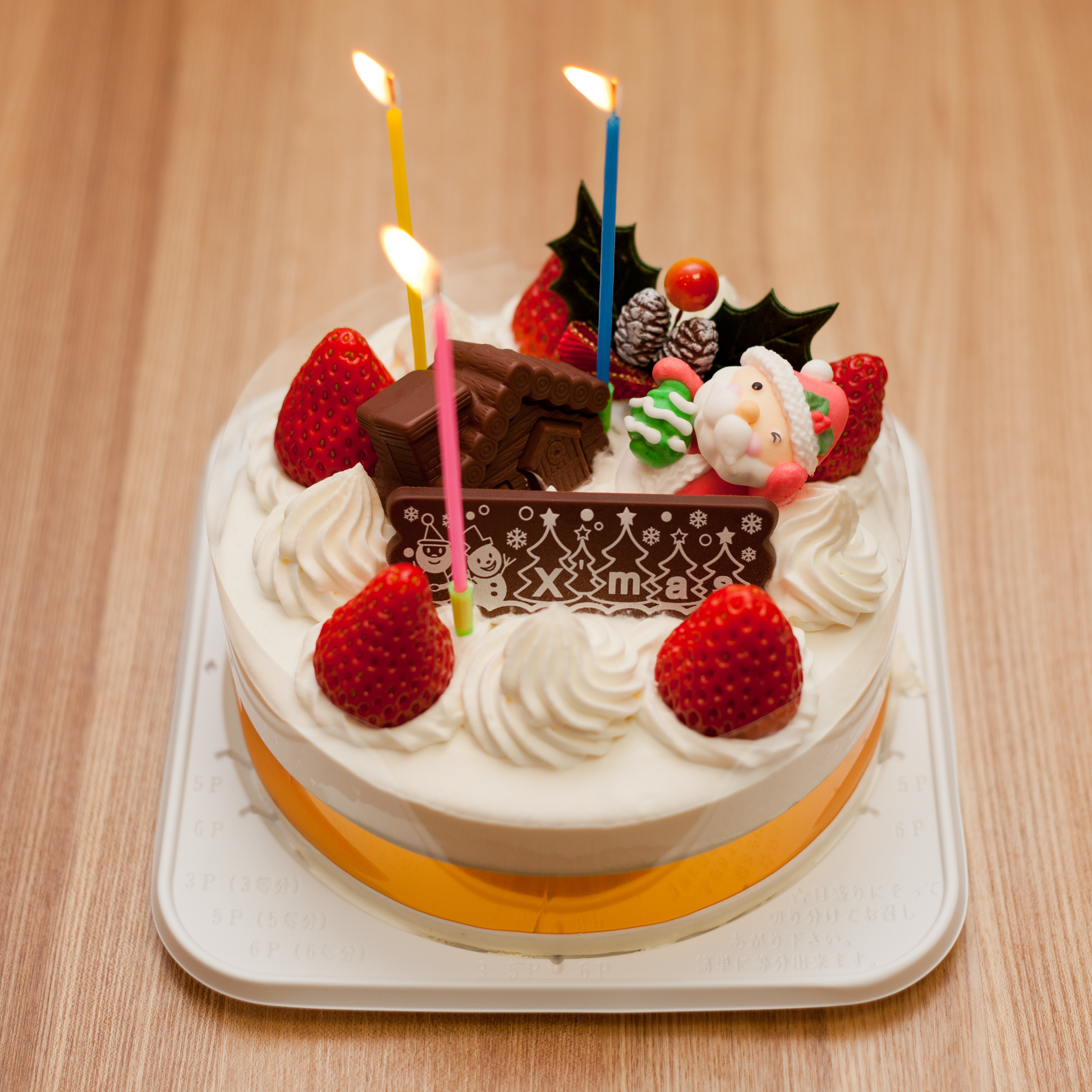
Japanese style Christmas cake

In early 20th century, Fujii Rin'emo travelled to United States to study Westerned styled food. When he returned to Japan, he made his own version of strawberry cake by using primary ingredients like strawberry, whipped cream, and sponge cakes. It is popular tradition to eat Strawberry Cake during Christmas season.

== See also ==
- List of cakes
- List of strawberry dishes
- List of strawberry topics
