= Strawberry shortcake (dessert) =

Dessert cake made with strawberries

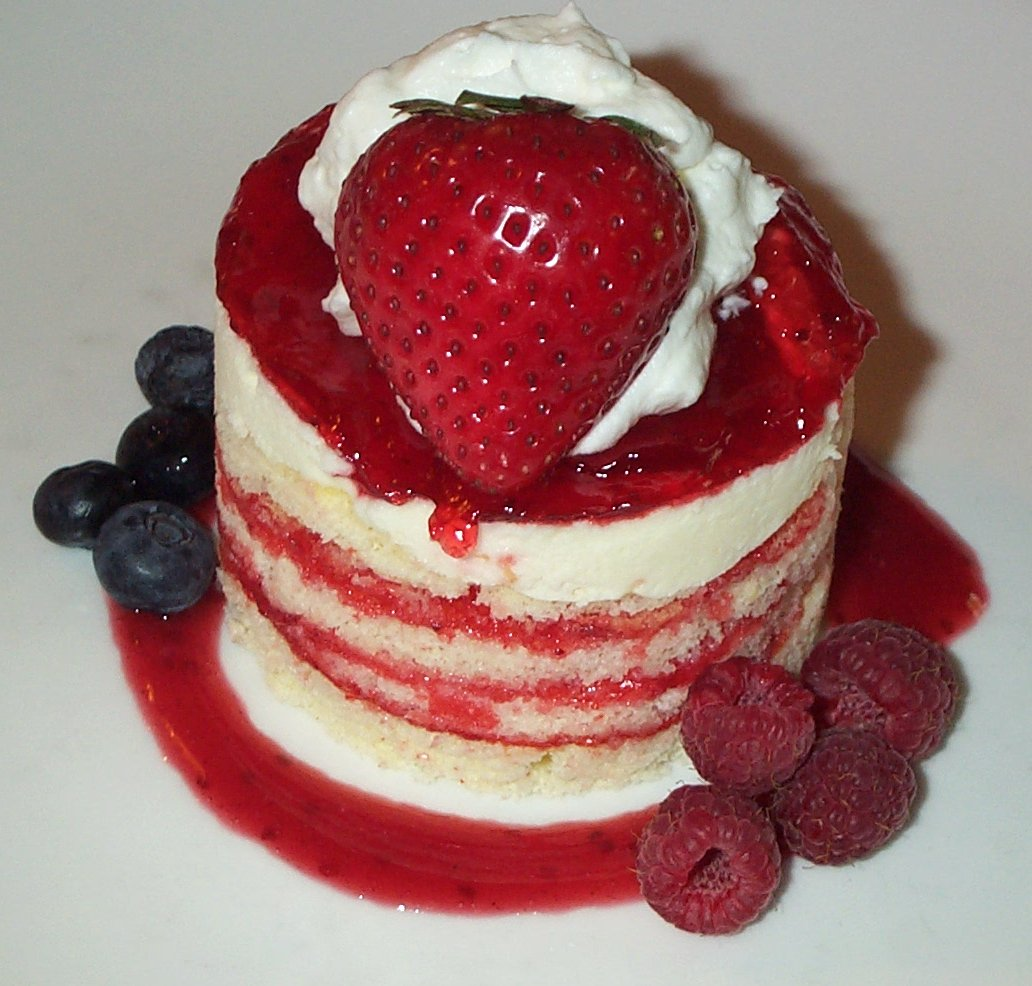
- Strawberry shortcake
- Type: Layer cake or Trifle
- Place of origin: United States
- Main ingredients: Biscuit or sponge cake, strawberry, whipped cream

Strawberry shortcake is an American dessert made with strawberries that have been sliced or macerated, sweetened cream or whipped cream, and either shortcake or sponge cake.

== History ==
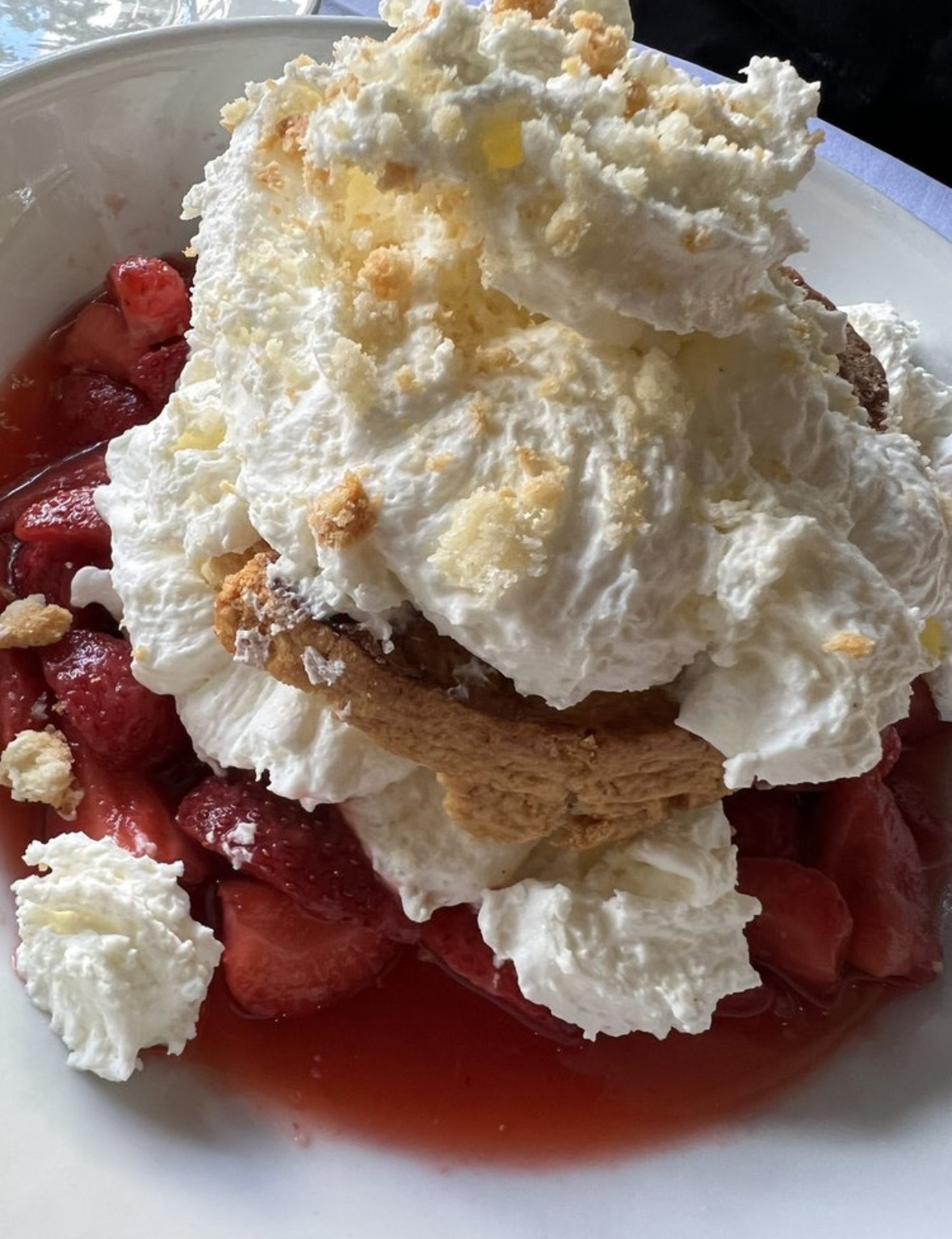
Strawberry shortcake from Gibson's Steakhouse in Chicago, Illinois

A recipe for a precursor of strawberry shortcake appeared as "Strawberry Cake" in the "Ladies' Department" column of The Ohio Cultivator in 1845, and was later popularized by Eliza Leslie of Philadelphia in The Lady's Receipt-book (1847). It featured rounds of unleavened shortcrust pastry that were split, filled with sweetened macerated strawberries, and coated with a hard royal icing.

By the 1860s, the recipe had evolved to use a large "dinner plate"-sized biscuit leavened with baking soda, which was split and filled with sugared strawberries and heavy cream, appearing as a three-layer "Strawberry Short Cake" in the Genesee Farmer in 1862 and as a two-layer "Strawberry shortcake" in Jenny June's American Cookery Book in 1866. The recipe continued to evolve, with the 1876 edition of The Home Cook Book featuring two recipes for "Strawberry Shortcake", one that swapped the heavy cream for whipped cream, and one that swapped the large leavened biscuit for small saucer-sized sponge cakes.

Sponge cake and pound cake versions rose in popularity in the Northern United States, where such cakes were more common than leavened biscuits. A 1901 article from Massachusetts called the sponge versions better than "true" strawberry shortcakes, but noted it "requires some imagination to call sponge cakes short", and a 1909 cookbook from Georgia specifically referred to the sponge version as "New England Strawberry Shortcake". In addition, convenience versions appeared using sponge cakes, such as a 1910 recipe for a soda fountain "Strawberry Shortcake" using store-bought angel food cake, or the pre-1930 strawberry-filled sponge cake predecessor of the Twinkie sold as "Hostess's Little Shortbread Fingers".

Japanese-style strawberry shortcakes, ichigo shōtokēki (いちごショートケーキ), were introduced in 1922 by Fujii Rin'emon, founder of Fujiya, who had traveled to the United States a decade earlier to study Western-style desserts. They are made using sponge cake, whipped cream, and strawberries, and therefore, due to their perishable nature, did not see widespread popularity in stores until the introduction of refrigerated display cases in the 1960s. Like fried chicken, it became a popular Christmas food due to its association with Western culture, with Fujiya selling 900,000 strawberry shortcake "Christmas Cakes" in 2014. The ubiquitous nature of the dessert in Japan led to a depiction of Japanese strawberry shortcake (🍰) being included as part of the first set of official emojis included in Unicode in 2010.

== Festivals ==
In the United States, strawberry shortcake parties were held as celebrations of the summer fruit harvest. This tradition is upheld in some parts of the United States on June 14, which is Strawberry Shortcake Day.

The city of Lebanon, Oregon, holds the Strawberry Festival each year on the first full weekend of June. Since 1931, the festival has featured the "World’s Largest Strawberry Shortcake", which is transported by float during the Grand Parade and then served by the Strawberry Queen and her Court to festival visitors. The title of "World’s Largest" is an honorary title. At approximately 5,700 lbs, the cake does not hold the world record, which is currently held by the town of La Trinidad, Benguet, in the Philippines, which made a 21,213.4 pounds (9,622.2 kg) one on March 20, 2004.

Plant City, Florida annually hosts the Florida Strawberry Festival, where strawberry shortcakes are the signature dessert, and the region's strawberries account for 75% of the United States' winter strawberry crop. Strawberry shortcake became the state dessert after the Florida Senate passed a bill to have it recognized by the state.

== Gallery ==
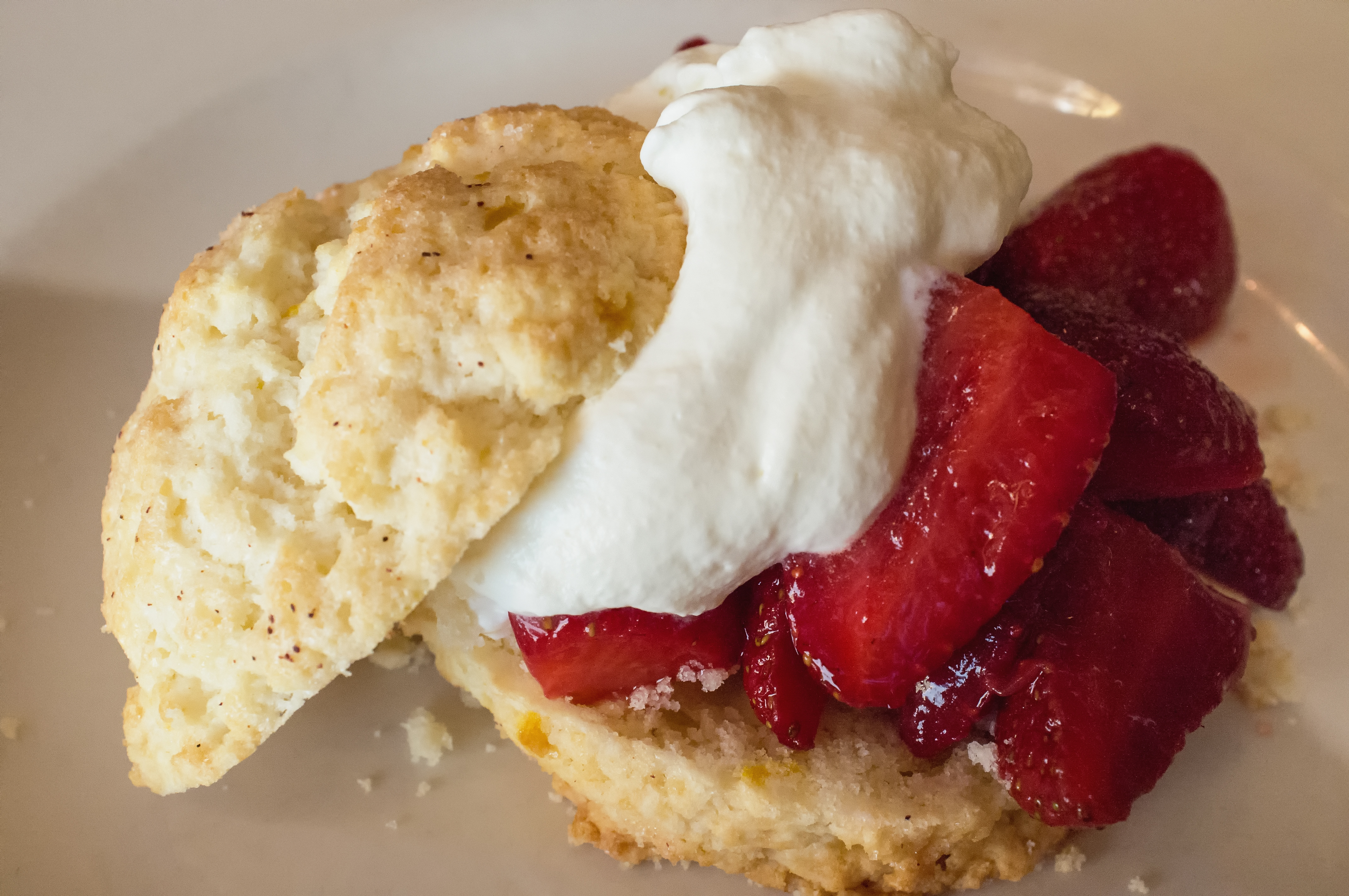
American-style strawberry shortcake with a biscuit base

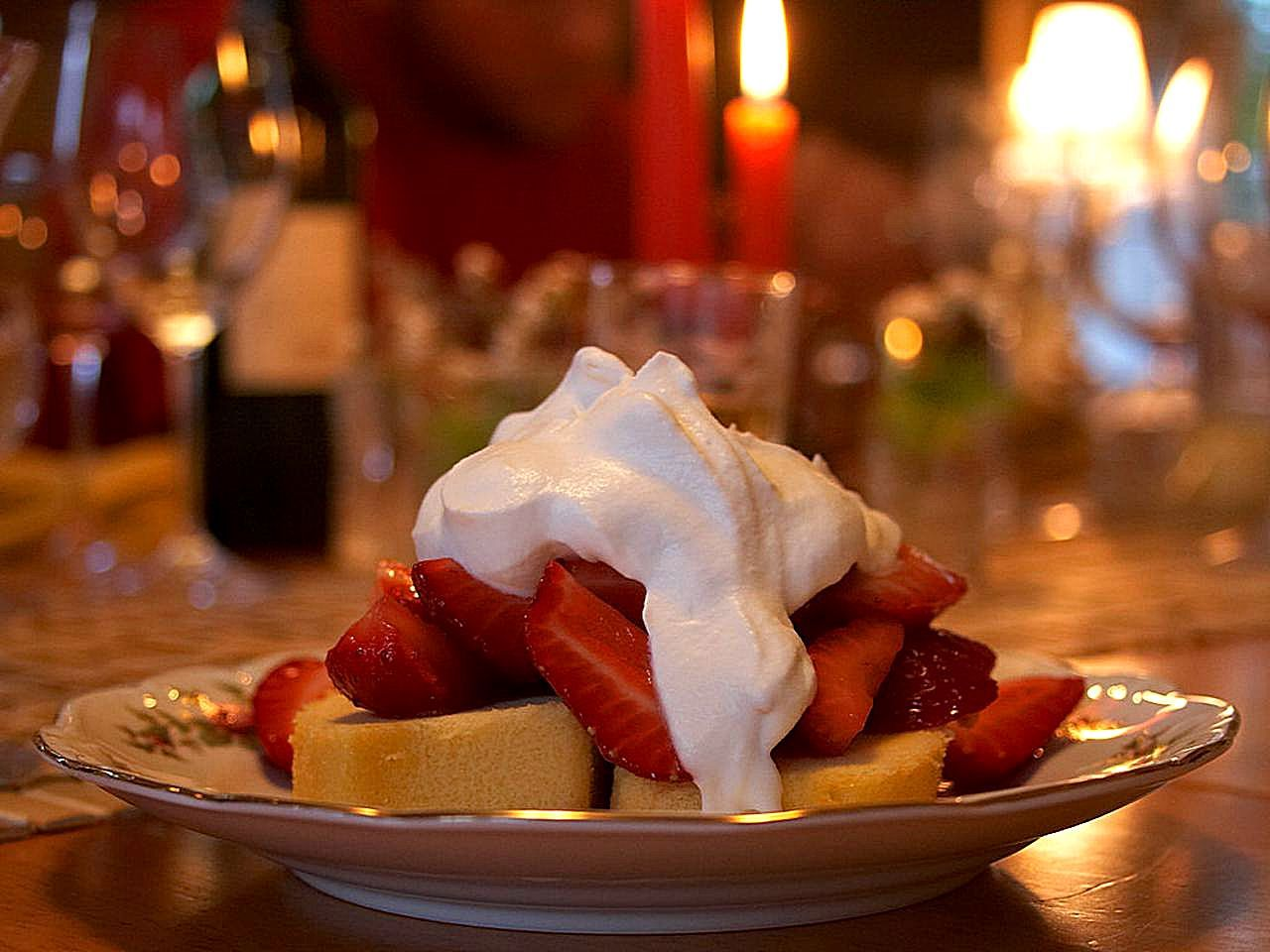
American-style strawberry shortcake with a sponge cake base

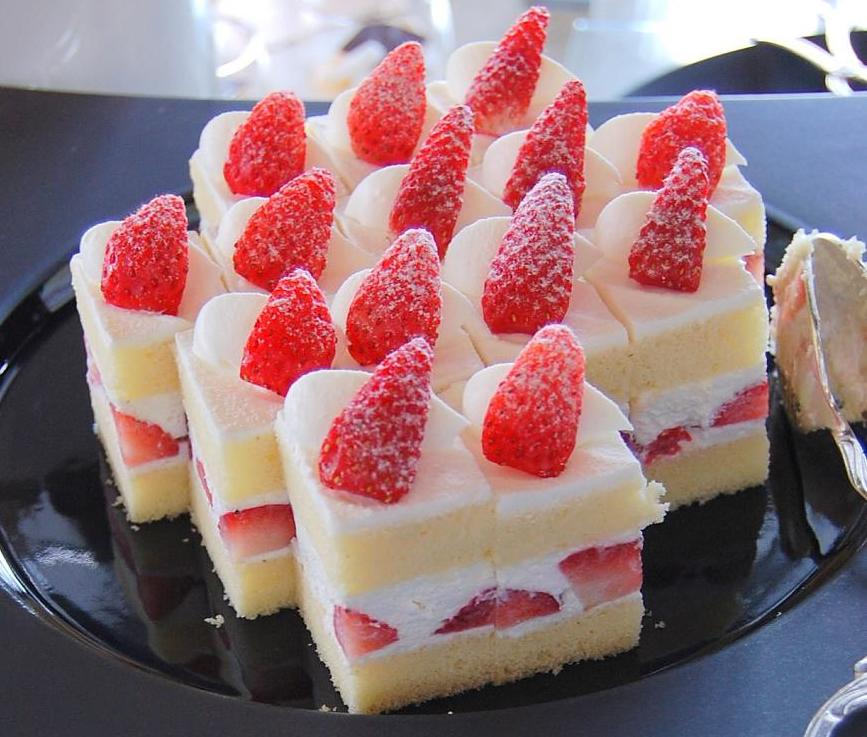
Asian-style strawberry short cake

== See also ==
- List of cakes
- List of quick breads
- List of strawberry dishes
- Strawberry cake
- Strawberry Shortcake, an American Greetings character who bears the name of, and is based on, the dessert
