= Fruli =

Belgian strawberry beer

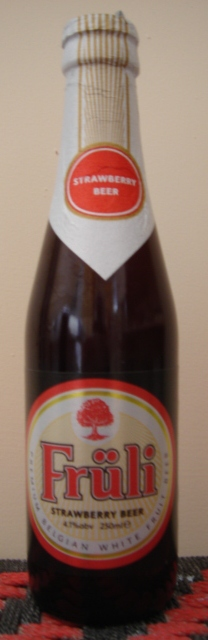
A bottle of Fruli

Fruli, Früli, or Van Diest Fruli is a strawberry-flavoured Belgian fruit beer, made at a craft brewery near Ghent by Brouwerij Huyghe. It is produced by blending Belgian wheat beer (70%) and pure strawberries (30%), and has 4.1% alcohol by volume.

== Awards ==
Früli won the gold medal at the UK's Food & Drink Expo in 2004. In 2009, it was announced as the "Worlds Best Fruit Beer" by the judges of the World Beer Awards.

== See also ==
- List of strawberry dishes
- List of strawberry topics
