= Strawberries Romanoff =

Type of dessert

Strawberries Romanoff

Strawberries Romanoff is a dessert of strawberries flavored with curaçao and orange, topped with sweet whipped cream. Several versions exist, including one using raspberries instead of strawberries (framboises Romanoff). Strawberries Romanoff is part of a broader category of desserts combining strawberries and cream.

The creation of strawberries Romanoff is sometimes credited to the French chef Marie-Antoine Carême, who is said to have created the dessert for Alexander I of Russia, Emperor of Russia in the early 19th century. Other authors credit Escoffier, who often served strawberries Romanoff at the Carlton Hotel in London. He includes a recipe in Guide Culinaire (1902), as well as Ma Cuisine (1934), where he directs cooks: "Soak some large strawberries in orange juice and Curaçao. Put them into a silver or glass dish and cover them with Chantilly cream." In one telling of the creation, Escoffier created fraises Romanoff in honor of a visit from members of the House of Romanoff.

Strawberries Romanoff became particularly popular in the US during the 1940s and 1950s, at a time when several establishments sought to claim it as their signature dish. Of these, the dish was most closely associated with Michael Romanoff, the owner of Romanoff's in Los Angeles, who claimed to be the dessert's inventor. Romanoff's was popular among Hollywood celebrities, and was marketed by the claims of Romanoff to be a prince of the House of Romanoff, even as this was little believed―he served his strawberries Romanoff sprinkled with brown sugar. Elsewhere in Los Angeles, strawberries Romanoff was served with ice cream at the Biltmore Hotel, who called the dish strawberries Biltmore. Ice cream was a common element in American preparations, and was included in the version prepared at the Palace Hotel, San Francisco, alongside maraschino, and anisette.

In Australia, strawberries Romanoff was popular in the 1960s and in the 1980s was cited by one author as a typical meal. One Sydney chef, speaking in 1982 lamented its popularity: "When I opened the Summit [in 1968], the favourite dishes were prawn cocktail, filet mignon and strawberries and cream. Now, after all the food revolutions that are supposed to have hit Sydney, the favourite dishes are prawn cocktail, filet mignon and strawberries romanoff. They are safe, you see, and you don't have to chew too hard." By the 1990s it had become rarely prepared in the country.

== See also ==
- List of strawberry dishes

== Sources ==
- Aresty, Esther B (1980). The Exquisite Table: A History of French Cuisine. Indianapolis, Indiana & New York: Bobbs-Merrill Company, Inc. ISBN 0-672-52307-8.
- Barker, William (1974). The modern pâtissier: a complete guide to pastry cookery. London: Northwood Publications Ltd. ISBN 7198-2603-9.
- Brown, Catherine (2013) [1985]. Scottish Cookery (4th ed.). Edinburgh: Birlinn. ISBN 978-1-78027-108-8.
- Lovegren, Sylvia (1995). Fashionable Food: Seven Decades of Food Fads. New York: Macmillan. ISBN 978-0-02-575705-9.
- Santich, Barbara (2013) [1996]. Looking for Flavour (Expanded ed.). Kent Town, South Australia: Wakefield Press. ISBN 978 1 74305 207 5.
- Segnit, Niki (2010). The Flavor Thesaurus. New York and London: Bloomsbury. ISBN 978-1-60819-874-0.
- Symons, Michael (1982). One Continuous Picnic. Adelaide, South Australia: Duck Press. ISBN 0-9593047-0-3.
- Symons, Michael (1983). "Australia's 'One Continuous Picnic'". In Davidson, Alan (ed.). Oxford Symposium on Food & Cookery, 1983: Food in Motion. Stanningley, Leeds: Prospect Books. ISBN 0-907325-15-7.
