= List of strawberry dishes =

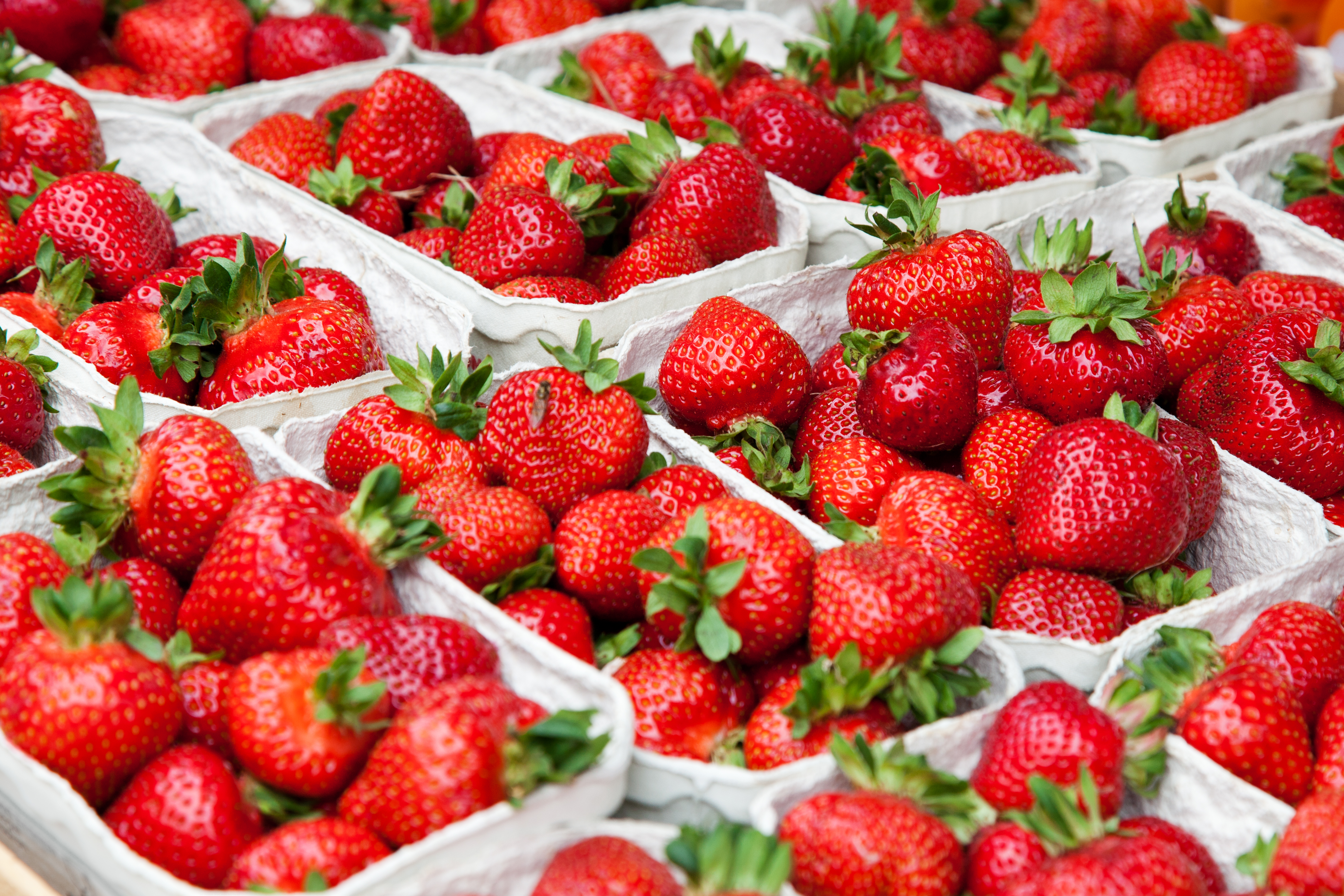
Ripe strawberries

This is a list of strawberry dishes, foods and beverages, which use strawberry as a primary ingredient. Several desserts use strawberries as a main ingredient, and strawberries are also used as a topping on some foods, such as French toast, waffles and pastries.

== Strawberry dishes ==
Image	Name	Associated regions	Description
	Bubu Lubu	Mexico	A popular trademark for candies from Mexico, featuring a strawberry and marshmallow filling with a chocolate covering. It is manufactured by Barcel (under the control of the Bimbo Company).
	Chocolate covered strawberries		Strawberries dipped in chocolate
	Eton mess	England	A traditional English dessert consisting of a mixture of strawberries or bananas, pieces of meringue, and cream, which is traditionally served at Eton College's annual cricket game against the pupils of Harrow School
	Fraisier	France	A classic French cake made of strawberries, genoise and cream The word "fraise" means strawberry in French.
	Pavlova	Australia/New Zealand	A cake that is traditionally decorated with a topping of whipped cream and fresh soft fruit such as kiwifruit, passionfruit, and strawberries.
	Strawberries Romanoff		A dessert of strawberries flavored with curaçao and orange, topped with sweet whipped cream.
	Strawberry cake		A cake that uses strawberry as a primary ingredient
	Strawberry cheesecake		Cheesecake with strawberries that may be used as a topping and/or incorporated into the cake itself
	Strawberry Delight	United States	A dessert salad found in the United States, especially in the South and more rural areas of Minnesota.
	Strawberry ice cream	Dates back at least to 1813 in the U.S.	A flavor of ice cream made with strawberry or strawberry flavoring
	Strawberry jam		Consists primarily of strawberries, sugar and/or corn syrup. Additional pectin is sometimes added. It is often canned or sealed for long-term storage.
	Strawberry parfait		A parfait with strawberries
	Strawberry pie		Consists of strawberries, sugar, a pie crust, and sometimes gelatin. Usually about 70% of the pie by weight may be strawberries. It is often served with whipped cream, or sometimes with ice cream.
	Strawberry rhubarb pie		A tart and sweet pie made with a strawberry and rhubarb filling.
	Strawberries risotto	Italy	A risotto made with strawberries.
	Strawberry shortcake	England, 1588 (first printed recipe)	Shortcakes are split and the bottoms are covered with a layer of strawberries, juice, and whipped cream
	Strawberry sundae		A sundae with strawberries as a primary ingredient
	Strawberry tart		A tart that incorporates strawberries as a primary ingredient
	Tanghulu	China	A traditional Chinese snack of candied fruit. Some versions are prepared using candied strawberry.
	Pasta with strawberries	Poland	A traditional Poland dish of strawberries mixed with kefir and pasta. Some versions are prepared adding the sugar to strawberry mix.

=== Beverages ===
Image	Name	Associated regions	Description
	Bloodhound (cocktail)		A bright red strawberry cocktail made with gin, vermouth and strawberry coulis
	Fruli	Belgium	A strawberry Belgian fruit beer, produced at a craft brewery near Ghent, Belgium
	Strawberry daiquiri		A common daiquiri variation prepared with strawberry juice or syrup
	Strawberry juice		Juice from strawberries; may be consumed as a beverage or used as an ingredient in beverages and foods
	Strawberry liqueur		Liqueur prepared with strawberry as a primary ingredient
	XUXU	Germany	A liqueur produced in Germany which derives its flavor from the strawberry fruit. It also has a small amount of lime juice.

== See also ==
- List of fruit dishes
- List of strawberry topics
- Strawberry festival
- Strawberry sauce
