= Michael Romanoff =

Hollywood personality (1890–1971)

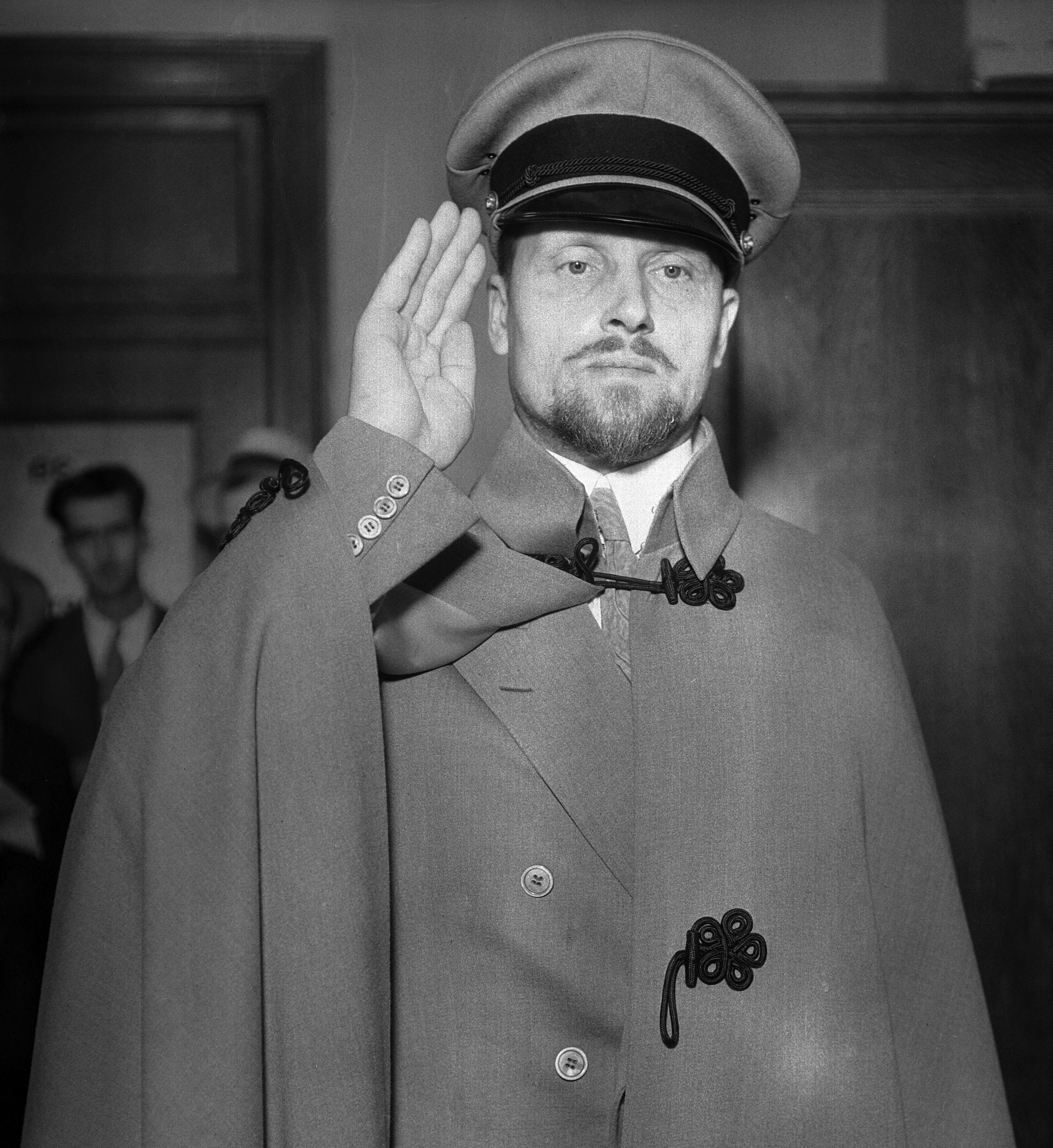
- Romanoff c. 1934
- Born: Hershel Geguzin; February 20, 1890; Lithuania
- Died: September 1, 1971 (aged 81); Los Angeles, California, U.S.
- Other name: Harry F. Gerguson
- Occupations: Actor; con man; restaurateur

Harry F. Gerguson (born Hershel Geguzin, February 20, 1890 – September 1, 1971), known as Michael Romanoff, was a Hollywood restaurateur, con man and actor born in Lithuania. He is perhaps best remembered as the owner of the now-defunct Romanoff's, a Beverly Hills restaurant popular with Hollywood stars in the 1940s and 1950s.

He claimed to be a member of Russia's royal House of Romanov (sometimes spelled "Romanoff" in English). This was widely known to be untrue throughout his career, but press reports tended to treat the deception as a humorous matter.

== Background ==
The New Yorker ran a series of five profiles, starting October 29, 1932, tracing Romanoff's history from birth until date of publication, including his having been deported to France in May of that year to serve time for fraud.

According to U.S.A Confidential (Mortimer and Lait, 1952), though Romanoff pretended to be Russian royalty, he was actually Hershel Geguzin, a former Brooklyn pants presser. Geguzin emigrated to New York City at age 10. He changed his name from Hershel to Harry F. Gerguson some time after 1900 and married Gloria Lister in 1948.

At times, he passed himself off as "Count Gladstone the son of William Gladstone", "Prince Michael Dimitri Alexandrovich Obolensky-Romanoff", nephew of Tsar Nicholas II, William Wellington or Arthur Wellesley.

David Niven devotes a whole chapter in his memoirs to Romanoff/Gerguson. Romanoff tells Niven to remember him to Commando chief Bob Laycock whom he knew at Eton. Niven dismisses this as nonsense, then Gerguson shows Niven a set of hair brushes with the Laycock crest and Niven is chastened. Niven learns that Gerguson took part in a cricket match at Wiseton, Notts (home of the Laycock family) involving a coal mining team. "What were you doing down a Durham coal mine?" asks Niven. There is also a record of a Harry Gerguson escaping from hospital in 1923 in U.S. immigration files.

Romanoff died of a heart attack in Los Angeles, California, in 1971 aged 81.

== Romanoff's restaurant ==
From 1941 to 1951, Romanoff's was located at 326 North Rodeo Drive. In February 1951, the restaurant moved to a new location at 140 South Rodeo Drive. Both the 1941 and 1951 buildings were designed by Douglas Honnold.

Romanoff generally snubbed his clientele, and preferred to lunch with his dogs.

KCET’s Hadley Meares writes of the restaurant, which used an elegant monogram consisting of a crown sitting over two capital letter 'R's back to back: "The décor was masculine and clubby with comfortable booths, the dance floor well waxed, the cigarette girls lovely, and the waiters well-trained and Jeeves-like."

While Romanoff's featured a typical country club-style menu with items like Waldorf salad, tomatoes stuffed with crab, filet mignon, frog legs, eggs Benedict and sausages on toast, the restaurant became known for its chocolate soufflés, which were served to each guest in an individual portion. Although Romanoff's restaurant is also known for popularizing the "American version" of the dessert Strawberries Romanoff, it was actually created by Escoffier when he was the chef at the Carlton Hotel in London – where he had originally called it "Strawberries Americaine Style" – strawberries in Grand Marnier, blended into whipped cream and softened ice cream.

Noodles Romanoff, which has some similarities to Beef Stroganoff, is a dish made of wide egg noodles, sour cream, and grated Parmesan cheese. While the dish's name may have led to its association with Michael Romanoff and his restaurant, it originally appeared in American newspapers in the early 1940s, credited variously to Mrs. Julius Gess, Mrs Harvey Kerr, and Mrs. Alice B. Edgerton.

The noodle dish originally appeared at Romanoff's in the mid-1950s, and became a popular menu item often mentioned in Hollywood reporting. Later, after Romanoff's went out of business, the dish was served at Stouffer's Top of the Rock Restaurant in Chicago. When Stouffer's closed that restaurant, the company transferred Noodles Romanoff to its newly formed frozen food grocery division. Soon, various companies' versions of Noodles Romanoff could be purchased in grocery stores for preparation at home. It was a popular side dish on American dinner tables through the 1960s, and recipes for it are available online from Betty Crocker, Creamette, and others.

The restaurant closed its doors on New Year's Eve 1962.

== Romanoff's On The Rocks ==
In 1959, Romanoff's On The Rocks opened in Palm Springs. Paul Whiteman and Red Norvo headed the house band. On The Rocks closed in 1962, and the venue became the Pompeii nightclub, later destroyed by arson.

== In popular culture ==
Romanoff is referred to in 1941's Hellzapoppin', the film version of the famous Broadway musical revue. In the film, Mischa Auer plays a "real Russian prince who is pretending to be a fake Russian prince." Although he is penniless, his deception gets him invited to high-society parties, where he can sponge off the guests and gorge himself on the food. He tells a fellow Russian expatriate, "Better that everyone should think I am a fake Russian prince. If they knew I was a real Russian prince, the novelty would wear off, and nobody would want me!"

At an early point in the original 1947 version of Miracle on 34th Street, a doctor expresses the opinion that Kris Kringle is of no harm to anyone despite his insistence that he is Santa Claus. In a reference to Romanoff, the doctor compares Kringle to a well-known restaurant owner – whose name escapes him at the moment – who insists that he is a member of the Russian royal family, but is otherwise quite normal.

Romanoff was one of several guest stars on The Jack Benny Program radio show on January 8, 1950. The episode featured Benny and other regular cast members attempting to solve a murder that had taken place at the Romanoff's in Beverly Hills. The episode is perhaps better known for having one of the longest laughs in the history of the series, based on a spoonerism of the name "Drew Pearson", pronounced "Drear Pooson", and quick thinking by the writers to incorporate the flub later in the program without telling Benny.

Romanoff was the guest star on the December 8, 1950, "Selling the Tavern" episode of the Duffy's Tavern radio show. In typical Tavern style, his claims of royalty are roundly mocked and even his small stature is joked about. Romanoff can also be heard as a contestant on the November 28, 1951, radio edition of the Groucho Marx quiz, You Bet Your Life. The television broadcast took place the next day.

In April 1957, the Jayne Mansfield–Sophia Loren photo was taken at Romanoff's restaurant.

Romanoff's was where the original rat pack—-Humphrey Bogart, Lauren Bacall, Sid Luft, Judy Garland, Katharine Hepburn and Frank Sinatra—-would congregate, Myrna Loy and her husband celebrated their divorce, and Hedda Hopper and Louella Parsons had their infamous reconciliation.

On April 14, 1957, he was a mystery guest on the television panel show What's My Line?

In the 1960 film Strangers When We Meet Kirk Douglas and Barbara Rush are seen dining at Romanoff's restaurant. Mike Romanoff himself make an uncredited appearance.

The 1965 cartoon series Roger Ramjet features a recurring villain named Noodles Romanoff.

The exterior of the then-shuttered Romanoff's can be seen in the 1967 Fox film, A Guide for the Married Man. Romanoff himself also plays the maitre'd in a sequence in the film in a studio recreation of the restaurant's interior.

Romanoff appeared in at least 20 other films and television shows playing either himself or acting in bit roles, such as a prince, maitre d', nobleman, or some other type of sophisticated European gentleman.

In 1977, Boz Scaggs' Down Two Then Left's album cover photography by Guy Bourdin features the then-shuttered Romanoff's restaurant.

In his last credited role, Alfred Ryder played Romanoff in the 1980 Humphrey Bogart TV-biopic Bogie.

== Filmography ==
Year	Title	Role	Notes
1937	Sing While You're Able	Prince Boris	
1938	Fools for Scandal	Party Guest	Uncredited
1945	Hollywood and Vine	Prince Romanoff – Owner of "Romanoff's"	
1947	The Other Love	Megaros – Sanitarium Patient	Uncredited
1948	Arch of Triumph	Capt. Alidze	
1948	An Innocent Affair	Venetian Room Maitre di'	
1950	In a Lonely Place	Prince Romanoff	Uncredited
1953	Paris Model	Prince Romanoff	
1960	Strangers When We Meet	Prince Romanoff	Uncredited
1963	Move Over, Darling	Floorwalker	Uncredited
1964	Shock Treatment	Asylum Patient at Dance	Uncredited
1964	Goodbye Charlie	Restaurant Patron	
1965	Von Ryan's Express	Italian Nobleman	Uncredited
1965	Do Not Disturb	Delegate	
1966	The Glass Bottom Boat	Husband	Uncredited
1967	Caprice	Butler	
1967	A Guide for the Married Man	Romanoff's Maitre'd	
1967	Tony Rome	Sal	Uncredited
