= ISpy (Modern Family) =

"iSpy"
- Modern Family episode
- Episode no.: Season 5 Episode 14
- Directed by: Gail Mancuso
- Written by: Abraham Higginbotham
- Production code: 5ARG13
- Original air date: February 5, 2014

Guest appearance
- Noah Weisberg as Brett

Episode chronology
← Previous "Three Dinners"	Next → "The Feud"
- Modern Family season 5

"iSpy" is the 14th episode of the fifth season of the American sitcom Modern Family, and the series' 110th overall. It was aired on February 5, 2014. The episode was written by Abraham Higginbotham and directed by Gail Mancuso. The episode's theme is the balance between trust and privacy as each character's story arc deals with trust issues in their own lives.

== Plot ==
Mitch (Jesse Tyler Ferguson) meets with a friend, Brett (Noah Weisberg), at a cafeteria and while they are talking, Brett wants to tell Mitch his secret, but makes him promise not to tell anyone especially Cam (Eric Stonestreet) because he will definitely tell everyone. Mitch promises and Brett tells him that he got calf implants. Mitch gets back home and Cam figures out that Mitch is hiding something from him and he pressures him into telling him despite him promising not to tell anyone. Cam starts spreading the news by texting his friends.

Gloria (Sofía Vergara) is mad at Jay (Ed O'Neill) because she thinks he was dreaming of another woman in his sleep. Jay can see that she is mad at him, but he does not know why and believes that Gloria went through his emails and saw that he loaned a woman friend some money.

Meanwhile, at the Dunphy house, Claire (Julie Bowen) wants to spy on her kids, Haley (Sarah Hyland) and Luke (Nolan Gould), because she believes they are hiding something from her. Haley has a photography class activity, but she does not want them to go, and Luke says he is going to his friend's place with Manny (Rico Rodriguez), but Claire does not trust that friend of his. She gets more worried when Haley tells them that Luke is going to a place that is notorious for kids doing drugs there.

Claire asks Alex (Ariel Winter) to snoop into Haley's room and find out what her sister is hiding while she and Phil (Ty Burrell) go and find Luke. Alex finds out where the exhibition is going to be and that Haley was selected from her class as one of the five who should take part in it. She calls the whole family to tell them to go to the exhibition after Claire's urging. Meanwhile, Claire and Phil discover that Luke and his friends are only making a movie, and they run away when their drone is spotted by the kids, though the kids believed that Steven Spielberg is attempting to steal their movie idea.

The whole family meets at Haley's exhibition, and Haley is freaked out to find them there. Her pictures are all moments of her family that she took without them knowing. Claire's paranoia and spying are exposed, but she defensively states that as a parent she has the right to worry. While watching the pictures, Cam claims that he only told one person about Brett, but Mitch sees on his phone that more than one person knows and that Cam lied. Gloria tells Jay why she is mad, and Jay explains that he was only dreaming of their son Joe in danger of falling off a building, and it was Joe he was calling baby. Jay admits, in a talking head cut, that it was actually Stella, the family French Bulldog, who was in danger in his dream.

Everything is settled down when the man who is in charge of the event tells Haley that one of her photos was sold. Haley is excited that she managed to get money from something she did on her own and everyone is proud of her.

== Cultural references ==
One of Haley's photos where Claire is staring at Gloria's cleavage is a re-shoot of Delmar Watson's famous photograph of Sophia Loren staring at Jayne Mansfield's cleavage.

== Reception ==
=== Ratings ===
In its original American broadcast, "iSpy" was watched by 9.87 million; up 0.28 from the previous episode.

=== Reviews ===
Leigh Raines from TV Fanatic rated the episode with 5/5 saying that the episode "was all about boundaries and spying on your loved ones."

Reviewer of My TV Experience gave a good review to the episode saying that it was great. "An eventful and hilarious episode came to a pretty sweet end as the family gathered around the pics Haley took of them."

Joshua Ashton of The A.V. Club gave a C rate to the episode saying that it was very boring. "It was penned by the rather handsome Abraham Higginbotham, whose episodes are usually reliable, but "iSpy" was a disappointing exception. What made the episode most frustrating is that sprinkled throughout its trio of wispy, half-formed stories, there were some decent jokes. It's beginning to feel like Modern Family will usually make the audience choose between engaging storytelling and well-crafted jokes. It can walk. It can chew gum. But for God's sake, don't ask it to do both at once." Ashton closes his review with: "Weeks like this make it really difficult to remember I’m watching a four-time Outstanding Comedy Series Emmy winner."
