= Shortcake =

Baked dessert with a crumbly texture

- Type: Cake or biscuit
- Place of origin: United Kingdom
- Main ingredients: Flour, sugar, butter, milk or cream

Shortcake generally refers to a dessert with a crumbly scone-like texture. There are multiple variations of shortcake, most of which are served with fruit and cream. One of the most popular is strawberry shortcake, which is typically served with whipped cream. Other variations common in the UK are blackberry and clotted cream shortcake and lemon berry shortcake, which is served with lemon curd in place of cream. Shortcake is also the name of a popular biscuit available in the UK, and a layered baked good from China (Xiting Shortcake).

== Preparation ==
Shortcake is typically made with flour, sugar, baking powder or soda, salt, butter, milk or cream, and sometimes eggs. The dry ingredients are blended, and then the butter is cut in until the mixture resembles cornmeal. The liquid ingredients are then mixed in just until moistened, resulting in a shortened dough. The dough is then dropped in spoonfuls onto a baking sheet, rolled and cut like baking powder biscuits, or poured into a cake pan, depending on how wet the dough is and the baker's preferences. Then it is baked at a relatively high temperature until set.

Strawberry shortcake is a widely known dessert made with shortcake. The shortcakes are split and filled with sweetened strawberries and whipped cream. In North America and Asia, sponge cakes filled with strawberries and whipped cream are also referred to as "strawberry shortcake" despite not being made with shortcake.

Though strawberry is the most widely known shortcake dessert, peach shortcake, blueberry shortcake, chocolate shortcake and other similar desserts are made along similar lines. In some recipes the shortcake itself is flavored; coconut is one addition.

== History ==
The short part of the name shortcake indicates something crumbly or crispy, generally through the addition of a fat such as butter or lard. The earliest printed mention of the descriptive term short – as in short cake – occurred in 1588, in the second English cookbook to be printed, The Good Huswifes Handmaid for Cookerie in her Kitchen (London, 1588). However, that recipe describes an unleavened biscuit or cookie (in the North American sense), made of flour, cream, sugar, egg yolk and spices.

Strawberries were included in a recipe for "Strawberry cake" which appeared in the June 1, 1845, issue (page 86) of The Ohio Cultivator (Columbus). The recipe was popularized by Eliza Leslie of Philadelphia in The Lady's Receipt-book (1847). These "Strawberry cakes" were made of a thick unleavened cookie of flour, butter, eggs and sugar, split, layered with fresh strawberries, and covered with a hard sugar-and-egg white icing.

The North American introduction of baking soda and baking powder as leaven in the 1800s revolutionized baking and made possible the American biscuit-style shortcake. By the 1850s, leavened shortcakes were the popular basis for American strawberry cakes, and the term strawberry shortcake became established.

By the 1860s, cream was being poured onto the shortcake and strawberries. A June 1862 issue of the Genesse Farmer (Rochester) described a "Strawberry Shortcake" made up of layers of soda biscuit, fresh berries, sugar, and cream. A similar recipe appeared in Jennie June's American Cookery Book (1866) by Jane Cunningham Croly. The first known cookbook by a black woman in the United States, A Domestic Cook Book (1866) by Malinda Russell, also contains a recipe.

== International variations ==
In the United Kingdom, Shortcake biscuits (North American:Cookies) are a dry sweet biscuit eaten as a snack or served with tea. They are lighter in texture than the similarly named shortbread.

Xiting shortcake, also known as Nangting Shortcake, is a Chinese baked good from Jiangsu Province. The shortcake has been made since the Qing dynasty, and is made with high-quality pale wheat flour, premium lard, and sugar, and is made up of 18 layers.

== Gallery ==
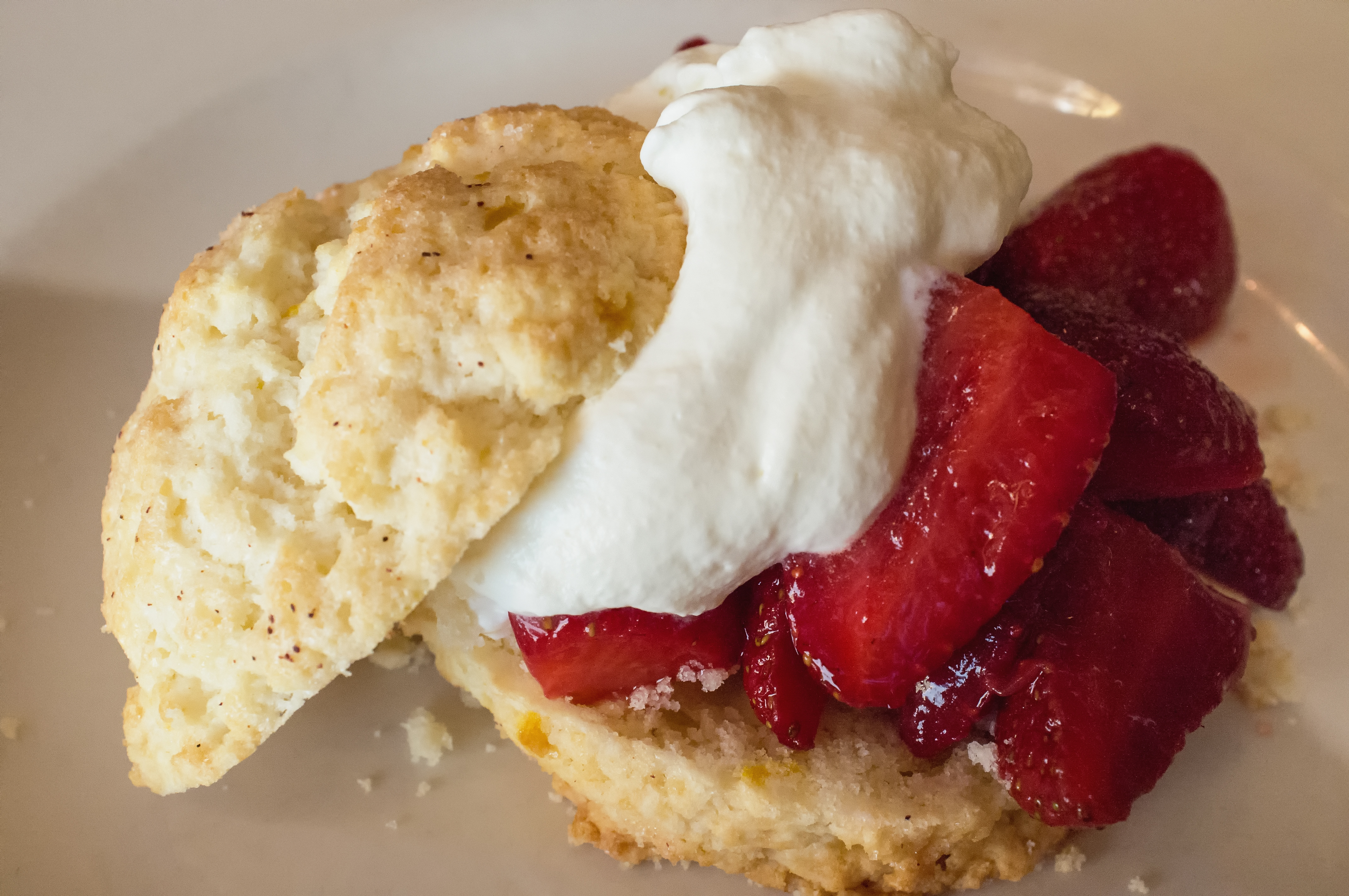
American-style strawberry shortcake with a biscuit base

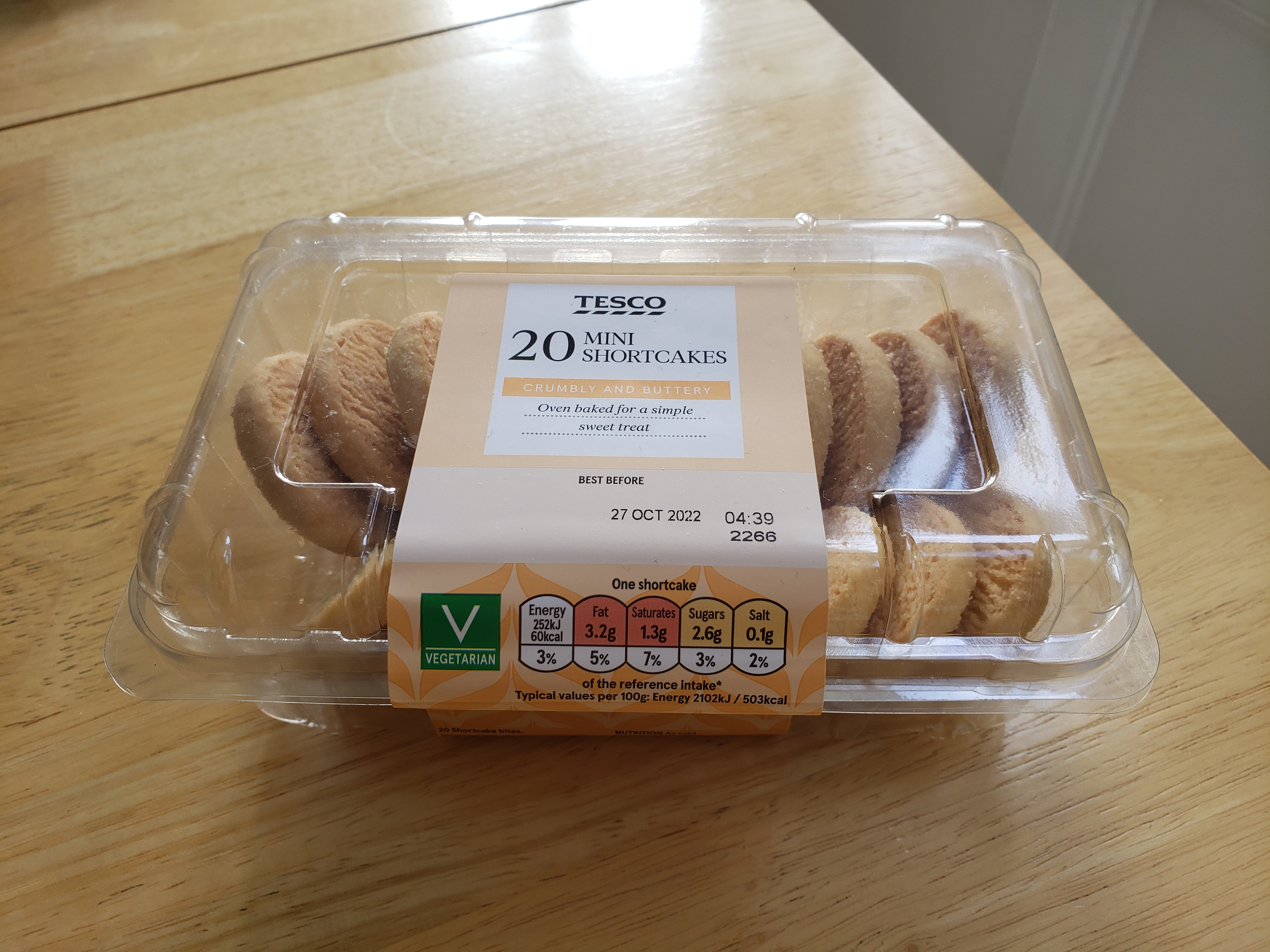
British Shortcake biscuits

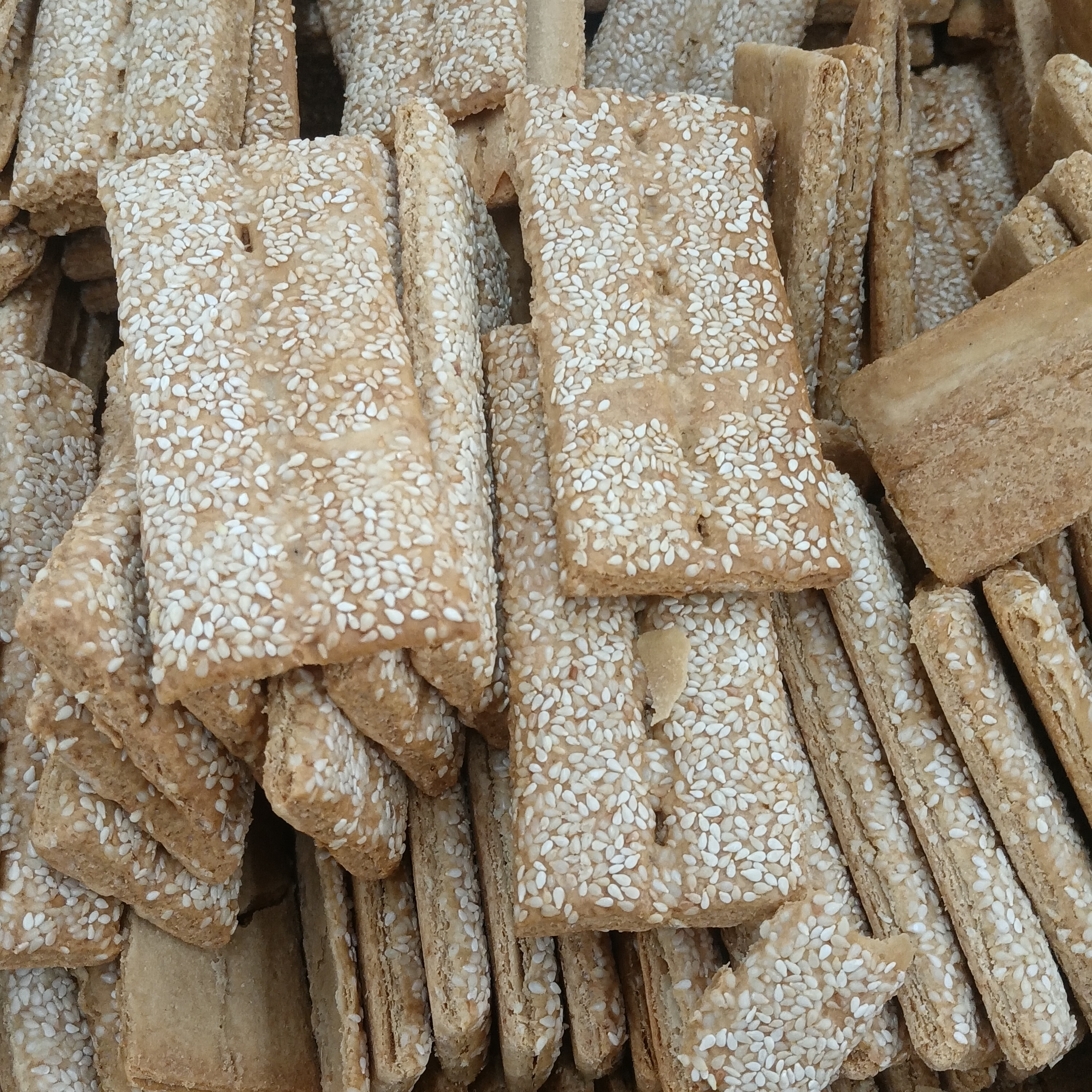
Nangtong or Xiting Shortcake, also known as Xiting Crispy Cake (Xiting Cuibing)

== See also ==
- List of cakes
- List of quick breads
- Strawberry shortcake (dessert)
- Joanie Cunningham, a Happy Days character nicknamed "Shortcake"
