= Rhubarb pie =

Pie with a rhubarb filling

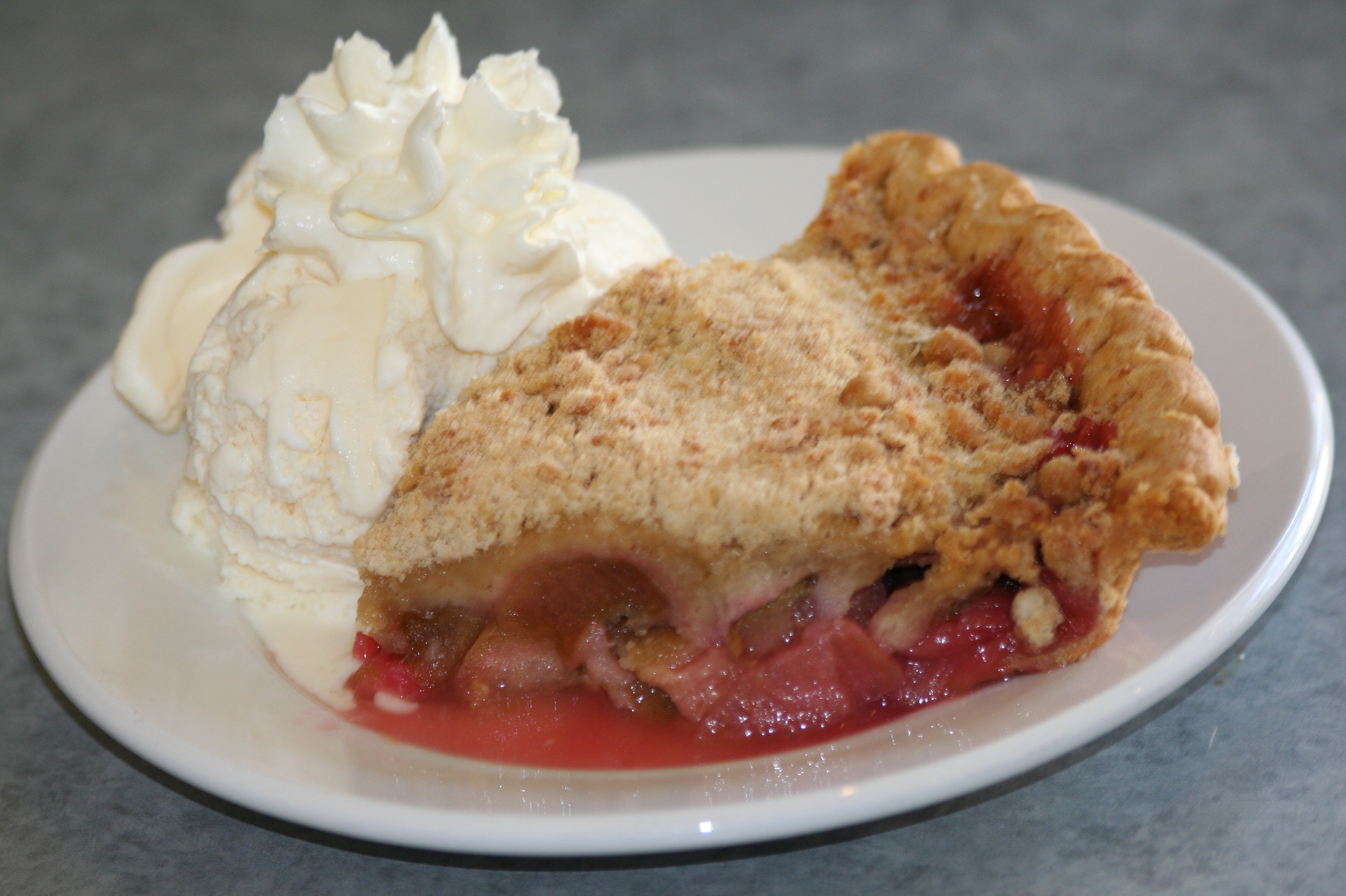
- Course: Dessert
- Place of origin: United Kingdom
- Main ingredients: Rhubarb

Rhubarb pie is a fruit pie with a rhubarb filling.

== United Kingdom ==
Rhubarb pie is popular in the United Kingdom, where rhubarb has been cultivated since the 1600s, and the leaf stalks eaten since the 1700s. Besides diced rhubarb, it usually contains a large amount of sugar to balance the tartness of the vegetable. The pie is usually prepared with a bottom crust and a variety of styles of upper crust.

== North America ==
In the United States, a lattice-style upper crust is often used. This style of pie is a traditional dessert in the country and is part of New England cuisine. Rhubarb has long been a popular choice for pie filling in the Great Plains and Midwest regions, where fruits were not always readily available.

Sumner, Washington, describes itself as the "Rhubarb Pie Capital of the World." It is unknown exactly when it gave itself this description, although it has been in use since at least the 1930s.

Rhubarb pies and desserts are also popular in Canada, as the rhubarb plant can survive in cold climates.

== Variations ==
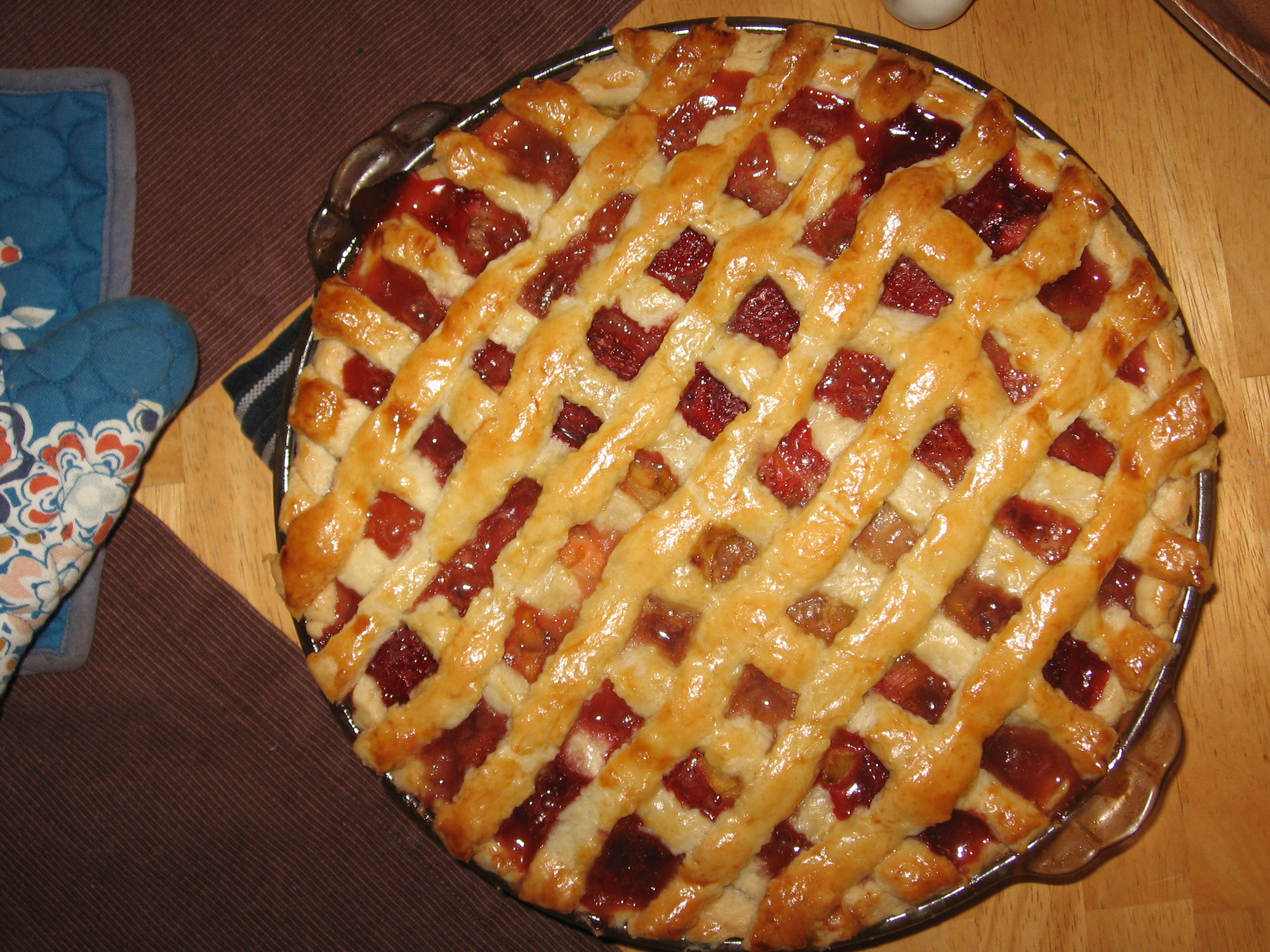
Strawberry rhubarb pie

A strawberry rhubarb pie is a type of tart and sweet pie made with a strawberry and rhubarb filling. This was created when the fruits were paired up and harvested in England in June and July. The British found the sweetness of the strawberries offset the tartness of the rhubarb. Sometimes tapioca is used as a thickener.

== See also ==
- List of strawberry dishes
- List of pies, tarts and flans
- Rhubarb Pie at the Wikibooks Cookbook subproject
- Strawberry Rhubarb Pie at the Wikibooks Cookbook subproject
