= List of awards and nominations received by Modern Family =

Modern Family awards and nominations
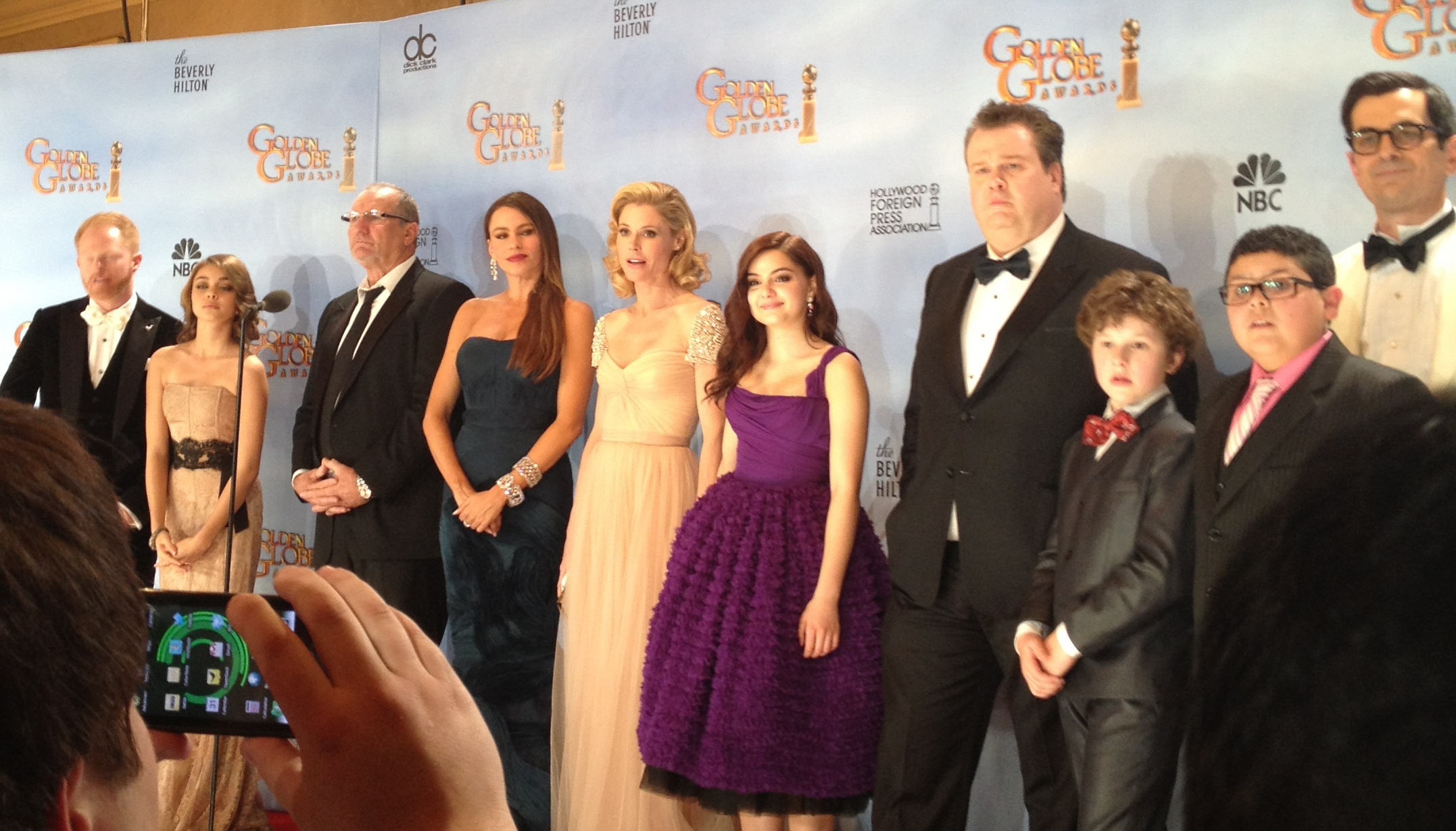
- The show's cast at the 69th Golden Globe Awards (left to right: Ferguson, Hyland, O'Neill, Vergara, Bowen, Winter, Stonestreet, Gould, Rodriguez, and Burrell)
Awards and nominations
Award	Wins	Nominations
ALMA Awards	2	5
American Cinema Editors Awards	1	3
American Comedy Awards	1	5
American Film Institute Awards	4	4
American Society of Cinematographers Awards	0	1
Art Directors Guild Awards	2	6
Artios Awards	3	6
ASCAP Film and Television Music Awards	1	1
British Academy Television Awards	0	1
California On Location Awards	0	4
Cinema Audio Society Awards	5	10
The Comedy Awards	3	9
Costume Designers Guild Awards	0	2
Critics' Choice Television Awards	3	16
Directors Guild of America Awards	2	10
Dorian Awards	3	14
GLAAD Media Awards	2	10
Golden Globe Awards	1	12
Guild of Music Supervisors Awards	0	1
Humanitas Prizes	5	5
ICG Publicists Awards	1	1
Imagen Awards	1	9
NAACP Image Awards	2	9
Nickelodeon Kids' Choice Awards	2	8
Peabody Awards	1	1
People's Choice Awards	2	25
Primetime Emmy Awards	22	85
Producers Guild of America Awards	4	7
Satellite Awards	0	9
Screen Actors Guild Awards	5	25
Screenwriters Choice Awards	2	4
Teen Choice Awards	0	23
Television Critics Association Awards	3	8
Women's Image Network Awards	2	9
Writers Guild of America Awards	6	19
Young Artist Awards	1	6
Young Hollywood Awards	0	1

Totals (Note: Certain award groups do not simply award one winner. They acknowledge several different recipients, have runners-up, and have third place. Since this is a specific recognition and is different from losing an award, runner-up mentions are considered wins in this award tally. For simplification and to avoid errors, each award in this list has been presumed to have had a prior nomination.)
- Wins: 92
- Nominations: 374

Modern Family is an American television sitcom created by Steven Levitan and Christopher Lloyd and aired by the American Broadcasting Company (ABC). The show premiered on September 23, 2009, and ended on April 8, 2020, after 250 episodes spanning eleven seasons. It stars Ed O'Neill, Sofía Vergara, Julie Bowen, Ty Burrell, Jesse Tyler Ferguson, Eric Stonestreet, Sarah Hyland, Ariel Winter, Nolan Gould, and Rico Rodriguez, with Aubrey Anderson-Emmons, Jeremy Maguire, and Reid Ewing joining the main cast in later seasons. The show uses a mockumentary format to follow three related families: the nuclear family of Phil, Claire, and their children Haley, Alex, and Luke; Jay and Gloria, a blended family with Gloria's son Manny; and gay partners Mitchell and Cameron, who adopt a daughter, Lily.

Modern Family was acclaimed during its run for its humor and portrayal of gay relationships, and it was credited with a resurgence in network sitcoms after its debut. The show won twenty-two Primetime Emmy Awards from eighty-five nominations, including Outstanding Comedy Series five consecutive times from 2010 to 2014, tied with Frasier for most wins in the category. It also won four Producers Guild of America Awards for Outstanding Producer of Episodic Television, Comedy and two GLAAD Media Awards for Outstanding Comedy Series. From critics' organizations, the show received a Golden Globe Award for Best Television Series – Musical or Comedy, a Critics' Choice Television Award for Best Comedy Series, and two TCA Awards for Outstanding Achievement in Comedy. Modern Family was named one of the top television programs of the year four times by the American Film Institute and received a Peabody Award in 2010.

O'Neill, Vergara, Bowen, Burrell, Ferguson, and Stonestreet were each nominated for multiple Emmys for their performances. They ultimately won a combined six Emmys – four for Supporting Actor in a Comedy Series (two for Stonestreet and two for Burrell) and two for Supporting Actress in a Comedy Series (for Bowen). In addition, the cast won five Screen Actors Guild Awards – four for Outstanding Performance by an Ensemble in a Comedy Series and one for Outstanding Performance by a Male Actor in a Comedy Series (for Burrell). The show's directors received four Emmys and two Directors Guild of America Awards, while its writers received six Writers Guild of America Awards as well as two Emmys.

== Awards and nominations ==
Awards and nominations received by Modern Family
Award	Year (Note: The listed year refers to the date of the ceremony, not necessarily the year in which the corresponding season or episode aired.)	Category	Nominee(s)	Result	Ref.
ALMA Awards	2011	Favorite TV Series	Modern Family	Nominated	
ALMA Awards	2011	Favorite TV Actress – Leading Role in a Comedy	Sofía Vergara	Nominated	
ALMA Awards	2011	Favorite TV Actor – Supporting Role	Rico Rodriguez	Won	
ALMA Awards	2012	Favorite TV Actress – Comedy	Sofía Vergara	Nominated	
ALMA Awards	2012	Favorite TV Actor – Supporting Role in a Comedy	Rico Rodriguez	Won	
American Cinema Editors Awards	2011	Best Edited Half-Hour Series for Television	Jonathan Schwartz (for "Family Portrait")	Won	
American Cinema Editors Awards	2012	Best Edited Half-Hour Series for Television	Steven Rasch (for "Express Christmas")	Nominated	
American Cinema Editors Awards	2013	Best Edited Half-Hour Series for Television	Ryan Case (for "Mistery Date")	Nominated	
American Comedy Awards	2014	Comedy Series	Modern Family	Nominated	
American Comedy Awards	2014	Comedy Supporting Actor – TV	Ty Burrell	Nominated	
American Comedy Awards	2014	Comedy Supporting Actress – TV	Julie Bowen	Nominated	
American Comedy Awards	2014	Comedy Directing – TV	Modern Family	Nominated	
American Comedy Awards	2014	Comedy Writing – TV	Modern Family	Won	
American Film Institute Awards	2010	TV Programs of the Year	Modern Family	Won (Note: One of ten official selections)	
American Film Institute Awards	2011	TV Programs of the Year	Modern Family	Won	
American Film Institute Awards	2012	TV Programs of the Year	Modern Family	Won	
American Film Institute Awards	2013	TV Programs of the Year	Modern Family	Won	
American Society of Cinematographers Awards	2012	Outstanding Achievement in Cinematography – Regular Series Half-Hour Television	James Bagdonas (for "Bixby's Back")	Nominated	
Art Directors Guild Awards	2010	Episode of a Half Hour Single-Camera Television Series	Richard Berg (for "Coal Digger") (Note: Additional nominees: Robert Vukasovich (art director); Mick Cukurs (set designer); Christopher Carlson (set decorator))	Nominated	
Art Directors Guild Awards	2011	Episode of a Half Hour Single-Camera Television Series	Richard Berg (for "Halloween") (Note: Additional nominees: Claire Bennett (assistant art director); Amber Haley (set decorator))	Won	
Art Directors Guild Awards	2012	Episode of a Half Hour Single-Camera Television Series	Richard Berg (for "Express Christmas") (Note: Additional nominees: Claire Bennett (assistant art director); Tara Stephenson (set decorator))	Won	
Art Directors Guild Awards	2013	Episode of a Half Hour Single-Camera Television Series	Richard Berg (for "Mistery Date") (Note: Additional nominees: Claire Bennett (art director); Brian Kasch (set decorator))	Nominated	
Art Directors Guild Awards	2014	Episode of a Half Hour Single-Camera Television Series	Richard Berg (for "The Wow Factor")	Nominated	
Art Directors Guild Awards	2015	Episode of a Half Hour Single-Camera Television Series	Claire Bennett (for "Halloween 3: AwesomeLand", "Marco Polo", and "Won't You Be Our Neighbor") (Note: Additional nominees: Sam Kramer (art director); Michael Voelker (set decorator))	Nominated	
Artios Awards	2010	Outstanding Achievement in Casting – Television Series, Comedy	Jeff Greenberg	Won	
Artios Awards	2010	Outstanding Achievement in Casting – Television Pilot, Comedy	Jeff Greenberg	Won	
Artios Awards	2011	Outstanding Achievement in Casting – Television Series, Comedy	Jeff Greenberg	Won	
Artios Awards	2012	Outstanding Achievement in Casting – Television Series, Comedy	Jeff Greenberg and Allen Hooper	Nominated	
Artios Awards	2013	Outstanding Achievement in Casting – Television Series, Comedy	Jeff Greenberg and Allen Hooper	Nominated	
Artios Awards	2015	Outstanding Achievement in Casting – Television Series, Comedy	Jeff Greenberg and Allen Hooper	Nominated	
ASCAP Film and Television Music Awards	2013	Top Television Series	Gabriel Mann	Won	
British Academy Television Awards	2012	Best International Programme	Modern Family (Note: Nominees: Steven Levitan and Christopher Lloyd)	Nominated	
California On Location Awards	2014	Location Professional of the Year – TV Episodic, Season	Jordana Kronen	Nominated	
California On Location Awards	2015	Location Professional of the Year – Half Hour Television	Jordana Kronen	Nominated	
California On Location Awards	2015	Teamsters 399 Assistant Location Manager of the Year – Television	Marta Tomkiw	Nominated	
California On Location Awards	2018	Location Manager of the Year – Half Hour Television	Jordana Kronen	Nominated	
Cinema Audio Society Awards	2011	Outstanding Achievement in Sound Mixing for Television Series	Stephen A. Tibbo and Dean Okrand (for "Chirp")	Nominated	
Cinema Audio Society Awards	2013	Outstanding Achievement in Sound Mixing for Television Series – Half Hour	Stephen A. Tibbo, Dean Okrand, and Brian R. Harman (for "Disneyland")	Won	
Cinema Audio Society Awards	2014	Outstanding Achievement in Sound Mixing for Television Series – Half Hour	Stephen A. Tibbo, Dean Okrand, and Brian R. Harman (for "Goodnight Gracie")	Won	
Cinema Audio Society Awards	2015	Outstanding Achievement in Sound Mixing for Television Series – Half Hour	Stephen A. Tibbo, Dean Okrand, and Brian R. Harman (for "Australia")	Won	
Cinema Audio Society Awards	2016	Outstanding Achievement in Sound Mixing for Television Series – Half Hour	Stephen A. Tibbo, Dean Okrand, Brian R. Harman, and David Torres (for "Connection Lost")	Won	
Cinema Audio Society Awards	2017	Outstanding Achievement in Sound Mixing for Television Series – Half Hour	Stephen A. Tibbo, Dean Okrand, and Brian R. Harman (for "The Storm")	Won	
Cinema Audio Society Awards	2018	Outstanding Achievement in Sound Mixing for Television Series – Half Hour	Stephen A. Tibbo, Dean Okrand, and Brian R. Harman (for "Lake Life")	Nominated	
Cinema Audio Society Awards	2019	Outstanding Achievement in Sound Mixing for Television Series – Half Hour	Stephen A. Tibbo, Dean Okrand, Brian R. Harman, Matt Hovland, and David Torres (for "Did the Chicken Cross the Road?")	Nominated	
Cinema Audio Society Awards	2020	Outstanding Achievement in Sound Mixing for Television Series – Half Hour	Stephen A. Tibbo, Dean Okrand, Brian R. Harman, Matt Hovland, and David Torres (for "A Year of Birthdays")	Nominated	
Cinema Audio Society Awards	2021	Outstanding Achievement in Sound Mixing for Television Series – Half Hour	Stephen A. Tibbo, Srdjan Popovic, Dean Okrand, Brian R. Harman, Peter Bawiec, Matt Hovland, and David Torres (for "Finale Part 1")	Nominated	
The Comedy Awards	2011	Best Comedy Series	Modern Family	Won	
The Comedy Awards	2011	Best Comedy Actor – TV	Ty Burrell	Nominated	
The Comedy Awards	2011	Best Comedy Directing – TV	Modern Family	Won	
The Comedy Awards	2011	Best Comedy Writing – TV	Modern Family	Nominated	
The Comedy Awards	2012	Best Comedy Series	Modern Family	Nominated	
The Comedy Awards	2012	Best Performance by an Actor – TV	Ty Burrell	Won	
The Comedy Awards	2012	Best Performance by an Actress – TV	Sofía Vergara	Nominated	
The Comedy Awards	2012	Best Comedy Directing – TV	Modern Family	Nominated	
The Comedy Awards	2012	Best Comedy Writing – TV	Modern Family	Nominated	
Costume Designers Guild Awards	2011	Outstanding Contemporary Television Series	Alix Friedberg	Nominated	
Costume Designers Guild Awards	2012	Outstanding Contemporary Television Series	Alix Friedberg	Nominated	
Critics' Choice Television Awards	2011	Best Comedy Series	Modern Family	Won	
Critics' Choice Television Awards	2011	Best Supporting Actor in a Comedy Series	Ty Burrell	Nominated	
Critics' Choice Television Awards	2011	Best Supporting Actor in a Comedy Series	Ed O'Neill	Nominated	
Critics' Choice Television Awards	2011	Best Supporting Actor in a Comedy Series	Eric Stonestreet	Nominated	
Critics' Choice Television Awards	2011	Best Supporting Actress in a Comedy Series	Julie Bowen	Nominated	
Critics' Choice Television Awards	2011	Best Supporting Actress in a Comedy Series	Sofía Vergara	Nominated	
Critics' Choice Television Awards	2012	Best Comedy Series	Modern Family	Nominated	
Critics' Choice Television Awards	2012	Best Supporting Actor in a Comedy Series	Ty Burrell	Won	
Critics' Choice Television Awards	2012	Best Supporting Actress in a Comedy Series	Julie Bowen	Won	
Critics' Choice Television Awards	2012	Best Guest Performer in a Comedy Series	Bobby Cannavale	Nominated	
Critics' Choice Television Awards	2013	Best Supporting Actress in a Comedy Series	Sarah Hyland	Nominated	
Critics' Choice Television Awards	2016	Best Comedy Series	Modern Family	Nominated	
Critics' Choice Television Awards	2016	Best Supporting Actor in a Comedy Series	Ty Burrell	Nominated	
Critics' Choice Television Awards	2016	Best Supporting Actress in a Comedy Series	Julie Bowen	Nominated	
Critics' Choice Television Awards	2018	Best Comedy Series	Modern Family	Nominated	
Critics' Choice Television Awards	2018	Best Supporting Actor in a Comedy Series	Ed O'Neill	Nominated	
Directors Guild of America Awards	2010	Outstanding Directorial Achievement in Comedy Series	Jason Winer (for "Pilot") (Note: Additional nominees: Howard Griffith (unit production manager); Lisa Statman (first assistant director); Helena Lamb (second assistant director); Shannon Speaker (second second assistant director))	Won	
Directors Guild of America Awards	2011	Outstanding Directorial Achievement in Comedy Series	Steven Levitan (for "Hawaii") (Note: Additional nominees: Sally Young (unit production manager); Alisa Statman (first assistant director); Helena Lamb (second assistant director); Matthew W. Heffernan (second second assistant director))	Nominated	
Directors Guild of America Awards	2011	Outstanding Directorial Achievement in Comedy Series	Michael Spiller (for "Halloween")	Won	
Directors Guild of America Awards	2012	Outstanding Directorial Achievement in Comedy Series	Fred Savage (for "After the Fire")	Nominated	
Directors Guild of America Awards	2012	Outstanding Directorial Achievement in Comedy Series	Michael Spiller (for "Express Christmas") (Note: Additional nominees: Sally Young (unit production manager); Jim Hensz (first assistant director); Helena Lamb (second assistant director); Matthew W. Heffernan (second second assistant director))	Nominated	
Directors Guild of America Awards	2013	Outstanding Directorial Achievement in Comedy Series	Bryan Cranston (for "Election Day") (Note: Additional nominees: Sally Young (unit production manager); Jim Hensz (first assistant director); Helena Lamb (second assistant director); Matthew W. Heffernan (second second assistant director); Patrick Richmond (additional second second assistant director))	Nominated	
Directors Guild of America Awards	2014	Outstanding Directorial Achievement in Comedy Series	Bryan Cranston (for "The Old Man & the Tree") (Note: Additional nominees: Sally Young (unit production manager); Jim Hensz (first assistant director); Helena Lamb (second assistant director))	Nominated	
Directors Guild of America Awards	2014	Outstanding Directorial Achievement in Comedy Series	Gail Mancuso (for "My Hero") (Note: Additional nominees: Sally Young (unit production manager); Alisa Statman (first assistant director); Helena Lamb (second assistant director))	Nominated	
Directors Guild of America Awards	2015	Outstanding Directorial Achievement in Comedy Series	Gail Mancuso (for "Las Vegas")	Nominated	
Directors Guild of America Awards	2016	Outstanding Directorial Achievement in Comedy Series	Gail Mancuso (for "White Christmas") (Note: Additional nominees: Sally Young (unit production manager); Jim Hensz (first assistant director); Jason Z. Kemp (second assistant director); Matt Baker (second second assistant director))	Nominated	
Dorian Awards	2010	TV Musical or Comedy of the Year	Modern Family	Nominated	
Dorian Awards	2010	LGBT-Themed TV Show of the Year	Modern Family	Nominated	
Dorian Awards	2011	TV Musical or Comedy of the Year	Modern Family	Nominated	
Dorian Awards	2011	LGBT-Themed TV Show of the Year	Modern Family	Nominated	
Dorian Awards	2012	TV Comedy of the Year	Modern Family	Won	
Dorian Awards	2012	LGBT-Themed TV Show of the Year	Modern Family	Won	
Dorian Awards	2013	TV Comedy of the Year	Modern Family	Nominated	
Dorian Awards	2013	LGBT TV Show of the Year	Modern Family	Won (Note: Tied with The New Normal)	
Dorian Awards	2013	TV Performance of the Year – Actor	Jesse Tyler Ferguson	Nominated	
Dorian Awards	2013	TV Performance of the Year – Actress	Sofía Vergara	Nominated	
Dorian Awards	2014	TV Comedy of the Year	Modern Family	Nominated	
Dorian Awards	2014	LGBT TV Show of the Year	Modern Family	Nominated	
Dorian Awards	2015	TV Comedy of the Year	Modern Family	Nominated	
Dorian Awards	2015	LGBTQ TV Show of the Year	Modern Family	Nominated	
GLAAD Media Awards	2010	Outstanding Comedy Series	Modern Family	Nominated	
GLAAD Media Awards	2011	Outstanding Comedy Series	Modern Family	Won (Note: Tied with Glee)	
GLAAD Media Awards	2012	Outstanding Comedy Series	Modern Family	Won	
GLAAD Media Awards	2013	Outstanding Comedy Series	Modern Family	Nominated	
GLAAD Media Awards	2014	Outstanding Comedy Series	Modern Family	Nominated	
GLAAD Media Awards	2015	Outstanding Comedy Series	Modern Family	Nominated	
GLAAD Media Awards	2016	Outstanding Comedy Series	Modern Family	Nominated	
GLAAD Media Awards	2017	Outstanding Comedy Series	Modern Family	Nominated	
GLAAD Media Awards	2018	Outstanding Comedy Series	Modern Family	Nominated	
GLAAD Media Awards	2019	Outstanding Comedy Series	Modern Family	Nominated	
Golden Globe Awards	2010	Best Television Series – Musical or Comedy	Modern Family	Nominated	
Golden Globe Awards	2011	Best Television Series – Musical or Comedy	Modern Family	Nominated	
Golden Globe Awards	2011	Best Supporting Actor – Series, Miniseries, or Television Film	Eric Stonestreet	Nominated	
Golden Globe Awards	2011	Best Supporting Actress – Series, Miniseries, or Television Film	Sofía Vergara	Nominated	
Golden Globe Awards	2012	Best Television Series – Musical or Comedy	Modern Family	Won	
Golden Globe Awards	2012	Best Supporting Actor – Series, Miniseries, or Television Film	Eric Stonestreet	Nominated	
Golden Globe Awards	2012	Best Supporting Actress – Series, Miniseries, or Television Film	Sofía Vergara	Nominated	
Golden Globe Awards	2013	Best Television Series – Musical or Comedy	Modern Family	Nominated	
Golden Globe Awards	2013	Best Supporting Actor – Series, Miniseries, or Television Film	Eric Stonestreet	Nominated	
Golden Globe Awards	2013	Best Supporting Actress – Series, Miniseries, or Television Film	Sofía Vergara	Nominated	
Golden Globe Awards	2014	Best Television Series – Musical or Comedy	Modern Family	Nominated	
Golden Globe Awards	2014	Best Supporting Actress – Series, Miniseries, or Television Film	Sofía Vergara	Nominated	
Guild of Music Supervisors Awards	2012	Best Music Supervision – Television	Andrea von Foerster (Note: Shared with Don't Trust the B— in Apartment 23, Stargate Universe, and Traffic Light)	Nominated	
Humanitas Prizes	2010	30 Minute Category	Steven Levitan and Christopher Lloyd (for "Pilot")	Won (Note: Tied with Liz Brixius, Linda Wallem, and Evan Dunsky for "Pilot" from Nurse Jackie)	
Humanitas Prizes	2011	30 Minute Category	Abraham Higginbotham (for "The Kiss")	Won	
Humanitas Prizes	2012	30 Minute Category	Abraham Higginbotham and Dan O'Shannon (for "Aunt Mommy")	Won	
Humanitas Prizes	2013	30 Minute Category	Danny Zuker and Christopher Lloyd (for "Party Crasher")	Won	
Humanitas Prizes	2015	30 Minute Category	Elaine Ko (for "Under Pressure")	Won	
ICG Publicists Awards	2012	Maxwell Weinberg Publicists Showmanship Award – Television	20th Century Fox Television	Won	
Imagen Awards	2010	Best Actress – Television	Sofía Vergara	Nominated	
Imagen Awards	2010	Best Supporting Actor – Television	Rico Rodriguez	Nominated	
Imagen Awards	2015	Best Primetime Television Program – Comedy	Modern Family	Nominated	
Imagen Awards	2015	Best Young Actor – Television	Rico Rodriguez	Won	
Imagen Awards	2016	Best Primetime Television Program – Comedy	Modern Family	Nominated	
Imagen Awards	2016	Best Actress – Television	Sofía Vergara	Nominated	
Imagen Awards	2016	Best Supporting Actor – Television	Rico Rodriguez	Nominated	
Imagen Awards	2017	Best Primetime Television Program – Comedy	Modern Family	Nominated	
Imagen Awards	2018	Best Primetime Television Program – Comedy	Modern Family	Nominated	
NAACP Image Awards	2011	Outstanding Comedy Series	Modern Family	Nominated	
NAACP Image Awards	2011	Outstanding Supporting Actress in a Comedy Series	Sofía Vergara	Won	
NAACP Image Awards	2011	Outstanding Directing in a Comedy Series	Kevin Rodney Sullivan (for "Game Changer")	Won	
NAACP Image Awards	2012	Outstanding Comedy Series	Modern Family	Nominated	
NAACP Image Awards	2012	Outstanding Supporting Actress in a Comedy Series	Sofía Vergara	Nominated	
NAACP Image Awards	2013	Outstanding Comedy Series	Modern Family	Nominated	
NAACP Image Awards	2014	Outstanding Comedy Series	Modern Family	Nominated	
NAACP Image Awards	2014	Outstanding Supporting Actress in a Comedy Series	Sofía Vergara	Nominated	
NAACP Image Awards	2015	Outstanding Supporting Actress in a Comedy Series	Sofía Vergara	Nominated	
Nickelodeon Kids' Choice Awards	2012	Favorite TV Actor	Ty Burrell	Nominated	
Nickelodeon Kids' Choice Awards	2015	Favorite Family TV Show	Modern Family	Won	
Nickelodeon Kids' Choice Awards	2016	Favorite Family TV Show	Modern Family	Nominated	
Nickelodeon Kids' Choice Awards	2016	Favorite Male TV Star – Family Show	Rico Rodriguez	Nominated	
Nickelodeon Kids' Choice Awards	2016	Favorite Female TV Star – Family Show	Sarah Hyland	Nominated	
Nickelodeon Kids' Choice Awards	2016	Favorite Female TV Star – Family Show	Sofía Vergara	Won	
Nickelodeon Kids' Choice Awards	2019	Favorite Funny TV Show	Modern Family	Nominated	
Nickelodeon Kids' Choice Awards	2020	Favorite Family TV Show	Modern Family	Nominated	
Peabody Awards	2010	—	Modern Family (Note: Presented to 20th Century Fox Television in association with Levitan Lloyd Productions)	Won	
People's Choice Awards	2010	Favorite New TV Comedy	Modern Family	Nominated	
People's Choice Awards	2011	Favorite TV Comedy	Modern Family	Nominated	
People's Choice Awards	2011	Favorite TV Family	The Pritchetts/Dunphys	Nominated	
People's Choice Awards	2012	Favorite Network TV Comedy	Modern Family	Nominated	
People's Choice Awards	2013	Favorite Network TV Comedy	Modern Family	Nominated	
People's Choice Awards	2013	Favorite Comedic TV Actor	Ty Burrell	Nominated	
People's Choice Awards	2013	Favorite Comedic TV Actor	Jesse Tyler Ferguson	Nominated	
People's Choice Awards	2013	Favorite Comedic TV Actress	Sofía Vergara	Nominated	
People's Choice Awards	2014	Favorite Network TV Comedy	Modern Family	Nominated	
People's Choice Awards	2014	Favorite Comedic TV Actor	Jesse Tyler Ferguson	Nominated	
People's Choice Awards	2015	Favorite Network TV Comedy	Modern Family	Nominated	
People's Choice Awards	2015	Favorite Comedic TV Actor	Ty Burrell	Nominated	
People's Choice Awards	2015	Favorite Comedic TV Actor	Jesse Tyler Ferguson	Nominated	
People's Choice Awards	2015	Favorite Comedic TV Actress	Sofía Vergara	Nominated	
People's Choice Awards	2016	Favorite Network TV Comedy	Modern Family	Nominated	
People's Choice Awards	2016	Favorite Comedic TV Actor	Jesse Tyler Ferguson	Nominated	
People's Choice Awards	2016	Favorite Comedic TV Actress	Sofía Vergara	Nominated	
People's Choice Awards	2017	Favorite Network TV Comedy	Modern Family	Nominated	
People's Choice Awards	2017	Favorite Comedic TV Actress	Sofía Vergara	Won	
People's Choice Awards	2018	The Comedy Show of 2018	Modern Family	Nominated	
People's Choice Awards	2018	The Comedy TV Star of 2018	Sofía Vergara	Nominated	
People's Choice Awards	2019	The Comedy Show of 2019	Modern Family	Nominated	
People's Choice Awards	2020	The Comedy Show of 2020	Modern Family	Nominated	
People's Choice Awards	2020	The Female TV Star of 2020	Sofía Vergara	Nominated	
People's Choice Awards	2020	The Comedy TV Star of 2020	Sofía Vergara	Won	
Primetime Emmy Awards	2010	Outstanding Comedy Series	Modern Family (Note: Nominees: Steven Levitan and Christopher Lloyd (executive producers); Jason Winer, Danny Zuker, Dan O'Shannon, Bill Wrubel, Paul Corrigan, and Brad Walsh (co-executive producers); Jeff Morton (producer))	Won	
Primetime Emmy Awards	2010	Outstanding Supporting Actor in a Comedy Series	Ty Burrell	Nominated	
Primetime Emmy Awards	2010	Outstanding Supporting Actor in a Comedy Series	Jesse Tyler Ferguson	Nominated	
Primetime Emmy Awards	2010	Outstanding Supporting Actor in a Comedy Series	Eric Stonestreet	Won	
Primetime Emmy Awards	2010	Outstanding Supporting Actress in a Comedy Series	Julie Bowen	Nominated	
Primetime Emmy Awards	2010	Outstanding Supporting Actress in a Comedy Series	Sofía Vergara	Nominated	
Primetime Emmy Awards	2010	Outstanding Directing for a Comedy Series	Jason Winer (for "Pilot")	Nominated	
Primetime Emmy Awards	2010	Outstanding Writing for a Comedy Series	Steven Levitan and Christopher Lloyd (for "Pilot")	Won	
Primetime Emmy Awards	2011	Outstanding Comedy Series	Modern Family (Note: Nominees: Steven Levitan and Christopher Lloyd (executive producers); Jeff Morton, Danny Zuker, Dan O'Shannon, Bill Wrubel, Paul Corrigan, Brad Walsh, Ilana Wernick, Jeffrey Richman, and Abraham Higginbotham (co-executive producers))	Won	
Primetime Emmy Awards	2011	Outstanding Supporting Actor in a Comedy Series	Ty Burrell	Won	
Primetime Emmy Awards	2011	Outstanding Supporting Actor in a Comedy Series	Jesse Tyler Ferguson	Nominated	
Primetime Emmy Awards	2011	Outstanding Supporting Actor in a Comedy Series	Ed O'Neill	Nominated	
Primetime Emmy Awards	2011	Outstanding Supporting Actor in a Comedy Series	Eric Stonestreet	Nominated	
Primetime Emmy Awards	2011	Outstanding Supporting Actress in a Comedy Series	Julie Bowen	Won	
Primetime Emmy Awards	2011	Outstanding Supporting Actress in a Comedy Series	Sofía Vergara	Nominated	
Primetime Emmy Awards	2011	Outstanding Directing for a Comedy Series	Steven Levitan (for "See You Next Fall")	Nominated	
Primetime Emmy Awards	2011	Outstanding Directing for a Comedy Series	Gail Mancuso (for "Slow Down Your Neighbors")	Nominated	
Primetime Emmy Awards	2011	Outstanding Directing for a Comedy Series	Michael Spiller (for "Halloween")	Won	
Primetime Emmy Awards	2011	Outstanding Writing for a Comedy Series	Steven Levitan and Jeffrey Richman (for "Caught in the Act")	Won	
Primetime Emmy Awards	2012	Outstanding Comedy Series	Modern Family (Note: Nominees: Steven Levitan, Christopher Lloyd, Danny Zuker, Dan O'Shannon, Bill Wrubel, Paul Corrigan, and Brad Walsh (executive producers); Jeff Morton, Jeffrey Richman, Abraham Higginbotham, and Cindy Chupack (co-executive producers); Chris Smirnoff (producer))	Won	
Primetime Emmy Awards	2012	Outstanding Supporting Actor in a Comedy Series	Ty Burrell	Nominated	
Primetime Emmy Awards	2012	Outstanding Supporting Actor in a Comedy Series	Jesse Tyler Ferguson	Nominated	
Primetime Emmy Awards	2012	Outstanding Supporting Actor in a Comedy Series	Ed O'Neill	Nominated	
Primetime Emmy Awards	2012	Outstanding Supporting Actor in a Comedy Series	Eric Stonestreet	Won	
Primetime Emmy Awards	2012	Outstanding Supporting Actress in a Comedy Series	Julie Bowen	Won	
Primetime Emmy Awards	2012	Outstanding Supporting Actress in a Comedy Series	Sofía Vergara	Nominated	
Primetime Emmy Awards	2012	Outstanding Directing for a Comedy Series	Steven Levitan (for "Baby on Board")	Won	
Primetime Emmy Awards	2012	Outstanding Directing for a Comedy Series	Jason Winer (for "Virgin Territory")	Nominated	
Primetime Emmy Awards	2013	Outstanding Comedy Series	Modern Family (Note: Nominees: Steven Levitan, Christopher Lloyd, Danny Zuker, Dan O'Shannon, Bill Wrubel, Paul Corrigan, Brad Walsh, Jeffrey Richman, Abraham Higginbotham, and Jeff Morton (executive producers); Ben Karlin (co-executive producer); Elaine Ko and Chris Smirnoff (producers))	Won	
Primetime Emmy Awards	2013	Outstanding Supporting Actor in a Comedy Series	Ty Burrell	Nominated	
Primetime Emmy Awards	2013	Outstanding Supporting Actor in a Comedy Series	Jesse Tyler Ferguson	Nominated	
Primetime Emmy Awards	2013	Outstanding Supporting Actor in a Comedy Series	Ed O'Neill	Nominated	
Primetime Emmy Awards	2013	Outstanding Supporting Actress in a Comedy Series	Julie Bowen	Nominated	
Primetime Emmy Awards	2013	Outstanding Supporting Actress in a Comedy Series	Sofía Vergara	Nominated	
Primetime Emmy Awards	2013	Outstanding Directing for a Comedy Series	Gail Mancuso (for "Arrested")	Won	
Primetime Emmy Awards	2014	Outstanding Comedy Series	Modern Family (Note: Nominees: Steven Levitan, Christopher Lloyd, Dan O'Shannon, Paul Corrigan, Brad Walsh, Bill Wrubel, Danny Zuker, Jeffrey Richman, Abraham Higginbotham, and Jeff Morton (executive producers); Ben Karlin (co-executive producer); Elaine Ko and Megan Ganz (supervising producers); Chris Smirnoff and Sally Young (producers))	Won	
Primetime Emmy Awards	2014	Outstanding Supporting Actor in a Comedy Series	Ty Burrell	Won	
Primetime Emmy Awards	2014	Outstanding Supporting Actor in a Comedy Series	Jesse Tyler Ferguson	Nominated	
Primetime Emmy Awards	2014	Outstanding Supporting Actress in a Comedy Series	Julie Bowen	Nominated	
Primetime Emmy Awards	2014	Outstanding Directing for a Comedy Series	Gail Mancuso (for "Las Vegas")	Won	
Primetime Emmy Awards	2015	Outstanding Comedy Series	Modern Family (Note: Nominees: Christopher Lloyd, Steven Levitan, Paul Corrigan, Brad Walsh, Danny Zuker, Abraham Higginbotham, Jeffrey Richman, and Jeff Morton (executive producers); Elaine Ko, Megan Ganz, Vali Chandrasekaran, Stephen Lloyd, Rick Wiener, Kenny Schwartz, and Chuck Tatham (co-executive producers); Chris Smirnoff and Sally Young (producers))	Nominated	
Primetime Emmy Awards	2015	Outstanding Supporting Actor in a Comedy Series	Ty Burrell	Nominated	
Primetime Emmy Awards	2015	Outstanding Supporting Actress in a Comedy Series	Julie Bowen	Nominated	
Primetime Emmy Awards	2016	Outstanding Comedy Series	Modern Family (Note: Nominees: Steven Levitan, Christopher Lloyd, Paul Corrigan, Brad Walsh, Danny Zuker, Abraham Higginbotham, Jeffrey Richman, Elaine Ko, Stephen Lloyd, and Jeff Morton (executive producers); Vali Chandrasekaran, Chuck Tatham, Andy Gordon, Jon Pollack, and Vanessa McCarthy (co-executive producers); Chris Smirnoff and Sally Young (producers))	Nominated	
Primetime Emmy Awards	2016	Outstanding Supporting Actor in a Comedy Series	Ty Burrell	Nominated	
Primetime Emmy Awards	2017	Outstanding Comedy Series	Modern Family (Note: Nominees: Christopher Lloyd, Steven Levitan, Paul Corrigan, Brad Walsh, Danny Zuker, Abraham Higginbotham, Jeffrey Richman, Elaine Ko, Stephen Lloyd, Vali Chandrasekaran, Chuck Tatham, and Jeff Morton (executive producers); Andy Gordon and Jon Pollack (co-executive producers); Sally Young (producer); Christy Stratton (consulting producer))	Nominated	
Primetime Emmy Awards	2017	Outstanding Supporting Actor in a Comedy Series	Ty Burrell	Nominated	
Primetime Emmy Awards	2020	Outstanding Directing for a Comedy Series	Gail Mancuso (for "Finale Part 2")	Nominated	
Primetime Creative Arts Emmy Awards	2010	Outstanding Art Direction for a Single-Camera Series	Richard Berg and Amber Haley (for "Moon Landing" and "Fears")	Nominated	
Primetime Creative Arts Emmy Awards	2010	Outstanding Casting for a Comedy Series	Jeff Greenberg	Won	
Primetime Creative Arts Emmy Awards	2010	Outstanding Guest Actor in a Comedy Series	Fred Willard (for "Travels with Scout")	Nominated	
Primetime Creative Arts Emmy Awards	2010	Outstanding Picture Editing for a Comedy Series (Single or Multi-Camera)	Ryan Case (for "Pilot")	Won	
Primetime Creative Arts Emmy Awards	2010	Outstanding Picture Editing for a Comedy Series (Single or Multi-Camera)	Jonathan Maxwell Schwartz (for "Family Portrait")	Nominated	
Primetime Creative Arts Emmy Awards	2010	Outstanding Sound Mixing for a Comedy or Drama Series (Half-Hour) and Animation	Stephen A. Tibbo, Brian R. Harman, and Dean Okrand (for "En Garde")	Won (Note: Also awarded to Tom Stasinis, Dennis Kirk, Alec St. John, and Todd Orr for "One Car, Two Car, Red Car, Blue Car" from Entourage)	
Primetime Creative Arts Emmy Awards	2011	Outstanding Art Direction for a Single-Camera Series	Richard Berg and Amber Haley (for "Halloween")	Nominated	
Primetime Creative Arts Emmy Awards	2011	Outstanding Casting for a Comedy Series	Jeff Greenberg	Nominated	
Primetime Creative Arts Emmy Awards	2011	Outstanding Guest Actor in a Comedy Series	Nathan Lane	Nominated	
Primetime Creative Arts Emmy Awards	2011	Outstanding Picture Editing for a Comedy Series (Single or Multi-Camera)	Ryan Case (for "Halloween")	Nominated	
Primetime Creative Arts Emmy Awards	2011	Outstanding Picture Editing for a Comedy Series (Single or Multi-Camera)	Jonathan Maxwell Schwartz (for "Slow Down Your Neighbors")	Nominated	
Primetime Creative Arts Emmy Awards	2011	Outstanding Sound Mixing for a Comedy or Drama Series (Half-Hour) and Animation	Stephen A. Tibbo, Dean Okrand, and Brian R. Harman (for "Halloween")	Nominated	
Primetime Creative Arts Emmy Awards	2012	Outstanding Casting for a Comedy Series	Jeff Greenberg	Nominated	
Primetime Creative Arts Emmy Awards	2012	Outstanding Guest Actor in a Comedy Series	Greg Kinnear	Nominated	
Primetime Creative Arts Emmy Awards	2012	Outstanding Single-Camera Picture Editing for a Comedy Series	Ryan Case (for "Leap Day")	Nominated	
Primetime Creative Arts Emmy Awards	2012	Outstanding Single-Camera Picture Editing for a Comedy Series	Steven A. Rasch (for "Election Day")	Nominated	
Primetime Creative Arts Emmy Awards	2012	Outstanding Sound Mixing for a Comedy or Drama Series (Half-Hour) and Animation	Stephen A. Tibbo, Dean Okrand, and Brian R. Harman (for "Dude Ranch")	Won	
Primetime Creative Arts Emmy Awards	2013	Outstanding Casting for a Comedy Series	Jeff Greenberg	Nominated	
Primetime Creative Arts Emmy Awards	2013	Outstanding Guest Actor in a Comedy Series	Nathan Lane	Nominated	
Primetime Creative Arts Emmy Awards	2013	Outstanding Single-Camera Picture Editing for a Comedy Series	Ryan Case (for "Party Crasher")	Nominated	
Primetime Creative Arts Emmy Awards	2013	Outstanding Sound Mixing for a Comedy or Drama Series (Half-Hour) and Animation	Stephen A. Tibbo, Brian R. Harman, and Dean Okrand (for "My Hero")	Nominated	
Primetime Creative Arts Emmy Awards	2013	Outstanding Stunt Coordination for a Comedy Series or a Variety Program	Jim Sharp	Nominated	
Primetime Creative Arts Emmy Awards	2014	Outstanding Art Direction for a Contemporary Program (Half-Hour or Less)	Claire Bennett, Sam Kramer, and Brian Kasch (for "Las Vegas")	Nominated	
Primetime Creative Arts Emmy Awards	2014	Outstanding Casting for a Comedy Series	Jeff Greenberg	Nominated	
Primetime Creative Arts Emmy Awards	2014	Outstanding Guest Actor in a Comedy Series	Nathan Lane	Nominated	
Primetime Creative Arts Emmy Awards	2014	Outstanding Single-Camera Picture Editing for a Comedy Series	Ryan Case (for "Las Vegas")	Nominated	
Primetime Creative Arts Emmy Awards	2014	Outstanding Sound Mixing for a Comedy or Drama Series (Half-Hour) and Animation	Stephen A. Tibbo, Dean Okrand, and Brian R. Harman (for "The Wedding, Part 1")	Nominated	
Primetime Creative Arts Emmy Awards	2015	Outstanding Casting for a Comedy Series	Jeff Greenberg	Nominated	
Primetime Creative Arts Emmy Awards	2015	Outstanding Guest Actress in a Comedy Series	Elizabeth Banks (for "Fight or Flight")	Nominated	
Primetime Creative Arts Emmy Awards	2015	Outstanding Sound Mixing for a Comedy or Drama Series (Half-Hour) and Animation	Stephen A. Tibbo, Dean Okrand, Brian R. Harman, and David Michael Torres (for "Connection Lost")	Won	
Primetime Creative Arts Emmy Awards	2016	Outstanding Casting for a Comedy Series	Jeff Greenberg	Nominated	
Primetime Creative Arts Emmy Awards	2016	Outstanding Sound Mixing for a Comedy or Drama Series (Half-Hour) and Animation	Brian R. Harman, Dean Okrand, and Stephen A. Tibbo (for "The Storm")	Nominated	
Primetime Creative Arts Emmy Awards	2017	Outstanding Sound Mixing for a Comedy or Drama Series (Half-Hour) and Animation	Dean Okrand, Brian R. Harman, and Stephen A. Tibbo (for "Basketball")	Nominated	
Primetime Creative Arts Emmy Awards	2018	Outstanding Sound Mixing for a Comedy or Drama Series (Half-Hour) and Animation	Brian R. Harman, Dean Okrand, and Stephen A. Tibbo (for "Lake Life")	Nominated	
Primetime Creative Arts Emmy Awards	2019	Outstanding Sound Mixing for a Comedy or Drama Series (Half-Hour) and Animation	Dean Okrand, Brian R. Harman, and Stephen A. Tibbo (for "A Year of Birthdays")	Nominated	
Primetime Creative Arts Emmy Awards	2020	Outstanding Guest Actor in a Comedy Series	Fred Willard (for "Legacy")	Nominated	
Primetime Creative Arts Emmy Awards	2020	Outstanding Sound Mixing for a Comedy or Drama Series (Half-Hour) and Animation	Stephen A. Tibbo, Srdjan Popovic, Brian R. Harman, Peter Bawiec, and Dean Okrand (for "Finale Part 1")	Nominated	
Producers Guild of America Awards	2011	Danny Thomas Award for Outstanding Producer of Episodic Television, Comedy	Modern Family (Note: Nominees: Steven Levitan, Christopher Lloyd, Jeff Morton, Dan O'Shannon, Jason Winer, Bill Wrubel, and Danny Zuker)	Won	
Producers Guild of America Awards	2012	Danny Thomas Award for Outstanding Producer of Episodic Television, Comedy	Modern Family (Note: Nominees: Paul Corrigan, Abraham Higginbotham, Steven Levitan, Christopher Lloyd, Jeff Morton, Dan O'Shannon, Jeffrey Richman, Brad Walsh, Bill Wrubel, and Danny Zuker)	Won	
Producers Guild of America Awards	2013	Danny Thomas Award for Outstanding Producer of Episodic Television, Comedy	Modern Family (Note: Nominees: Cindy Chupack, Paul Corrigan, Abraham Higginbotham, Ben Karlin, Steven Levitan, Christopher Lloyd, Jeff Morton, Dan O'Shannon, Jeffrey Richman, Chris Smirnoff, Brad Walsh, Bill Wrubel, and Danny Zuker)	Won	
Producers Guild of America Awards	2014	Danny Thomas Award for Outstanding Producer of Episodic Television, Comedy	Modern Family (Note: Nominees: Paul Corrigan, Abraham Higginbotham, Ben Karlin, Elaine Ko, Steven Levitan, Christopher Lloyd, Jeff Morton, Dan O'Shannon, Jeffrey Richman, Chris Smirnoff, Brad Walsh, Bill Wrubel, and Danny Zuker)	Won	
Producers Guild of America Awards	2015	Danny Thomas Award for Outstanding Producer of Episodic Television, Comedy	Modern Family (Note: Nominees: Paul Corrigan, Megan Ganz, Abraham Higginbotham, Ben Karlin, Elaine Ko, Steven Levitan, Christopher Lloyd, Jeff Morton, Dan O'Shannon, Jeffrey Richman, Chris Smirnoff, Brad Walsh, Bill Wrubel, Sally Young, and Danny Zuker)	Nominated	
Producers Guild of America Awards	2016	Danny Thomas Award for Outstanding Producer of Episodic Television, Comedy	Modern Family (Note: Nominees: Vali Chandrasekaran, Paul Corrigan, Megan Ganz, Abraham Higginbotham, Elaine Ko, Steven Levitan, Christopher Lloyd, Jeff Morton, Jeffrey Richman, Kenny Schwartz, Chris Smirnoff, Chuck Tatham, Brad Walsh, Rick Wiener, Sally Young, and Danny Zuker)	Nominated	
Producers Guild of America Awards	2017	Danny Thomas Award for Outstanding Producer of Episodic Television, Comedy	Modern Family (Note: Nominees: Vali Chandrasekaran, Paul Corrigan, Andy Gordon, Abraham Higginbotham, Elaine Ko, Steven Levitan, Christopher Lloyd, Jeff Morton, Jon Pollack, Jeffrey Richman, Chris Smirnoff, Chuck Tatham, Brad Walsh, Sally Young, and Danny Zuker)	Nominated	
Satellite Awards	2009	Best Actress – Comedy or Musical Series	Julie Bowen	Nominated	
Satellite Awards	2010	Best Television Series – Comedy or Musical	Modern Family	Nominated	
Satellite Awards	2010	Best Supporting Actor – Series, Miniseries, or Television Film	Ty Burrell	Nominated	
Satellite Awards	2010	Best Supporting Actress – Series, Miniseries, or Television Film	Julie Bowen	Nominated	
Satellite Awards	2011	Best Television Series – Comedy or Musical	Modern Family	Nominated	
Satellite Awards	2011	Best Supporting Actor – Series, Miniseries, or Television Film	Ty Burrell	Nominated	
Satellite Awards	2011	Best Supporting Actress – Series, Miniseries, or Television Film	Sofía Vergara	Nominated	
Satellite Awards	2012	Best Television Series – Comedy or Musical	Modern Family	Nominated	
Satellite Awards	2014	Best Television Series – Comedy or Musical	Modern Family	Nominated	
Screen Actors Guild Awards	2010	Outstanding Performance by an Ensemble in a Comedy Series	Modern Family (Note: Nominees: Julie Bowen, Ty Burrell, Jesse Tyler Ferguson, Nolan Gould, Sarah Hyland, Ed O'Neill, Rico Rodriguez, Eric Stonestreet, Sofía Vergara, and Ariel Winter)	Nominated	
Screen Actors Guild Awards	2011	Outstanding Performance by an Ensemble in a Comedy Series	Modern Family	Won	
Screen Actors Guild Awards	2011	Outstanding Performance by a Male Actor in a Comedy Series	Ty Burrell	Nominated	
Screen Actors Guild Awards	2011	Outstanding Performance by a Male Actor in a Comedy Series	Ed O'Neill	Nominated	
Screen Actors Guild Awards	2011	Outstanding Performance by a Female Actor in a Comedy Series	Sofía Vergara	Nominated	
Screen Actors Guild Awards	2012	Outstanding Performance by an Ensemble in a Comedy Series	Modern Family (Note: Nominees: Aubrey Anderson-Emmons, Julie Bowen, Ty Burrell, Jesse Tyler Ferguson, Nolan Gould, Sarah Hyland, Ed O'Neill, Rico Rodriguez, Eric Stonestreet, Sofía Vergara, and Ariel Winter)	Won	
Screen Actors Guild Awards	2012	Outstanding Performance by a Male Actor in a Comedy Series	Ty Burrell	Nominated	
Screen Actors Guild Awards	2012	Outstanding Performance by a Male Actor in a Comedy Series	Eric Stonestreet	Nominated	
Screen Actors Guild Awards	2012	Outstanding Performance by a Female Actor in a Comedy Series	Julie Bowen	Nominated	
Screen Actors Guild Awards	2012	Outstanding Performance by a Female Actor in a Comedy Series	Sofía Vergara	Nominated	
Screen Actors Guild Awards	2013	Outstanding Performance by an Ensemble in a Comedy Series	Modern Family	Won	
Screen Actors Guild Awards	2013	Outstanding Performance by a Male Actor in a Comedy Series	Ty Burrell	Nominated	
Screen Actors Guild Awards	2013	Outstanding Performance by a Male Actor in a Comedy Series	Eric Stonestreet	Nominated	
Screen Actors Guild Awards	2013	Outstanding Performance by a Female Actor in a Comedy Series	Sofía Vergara	Nominated	
Screen Actors Guild Awards	2014	Outstanding Performance by an Ensemble in a Comedy Series	Modern Family	Won	
Screen Actors Guild Awards	2014	Outstanding Performance by a Male Actor in a Comedy Series	Ty Burrell	Won	
Screen Actors Guild Awards	2014	Outstanding Performance by a Female Actor in a Comedy Series	Julie Bowen	Nominated	
Screen Actors Guild Awards	2015	Outstanding Performance by an Ensemble in a Comedy Series	Modern Family	Nominated	
Screen Actors Guild Awards	2015	Outstanding Performance by a Male Actor in a Comedy Series	Ty Burrell	Nominated	
Screen Actors Guild Awards	2015	Outstanding Performance by a Male Actor in a Comedy Series	Eric Stonestreet	Nominated	
Screen Actors Guild Awards	2015	Outstanding Performance by a Female Actor in a Comedy Series	Julie Bowen	Nominated	
Screen Actors Guild Awards	2016	Outstanding Performance by an Ensemble in a Comedy Series	Modern Family	Nominated	
Screen Actors Guild Awards	2016	Outstanding Performance by a Male Actor in a Comedy Series	Ty Burrell	Nominated	
Screen Actors Guild Awards	2017	Outstanding Performance by an Ensemble in a Comedy Series	Modern Family (Note: Nominees: Aubrey Anderson-Emmons, Julie Bowen, Ty Burrell, Jesse Tyler Ferguson, Nolan Gould, Sarah Hyland, Jeremy Maguire, Ed O'Neill, Rico Rodriguez, Eric Stonestreet, Sofía Vergara, and Ariel Winter)	Nominated	
Screen Actors Guild Awards	2017	Outstanding Performance by a Male Actor in a Comedy Series	Ty Burrell	Nominated	
Screenwriters Choice Awards	2013	Best Television Comedy	Modern Family	Won	
Screenwriters Choice Awards	2014	Best Television Comedy	Modern Family (Note: Nominees: Steven Levitan and Christopher Lloyd)	Won	
Screenwriters Choice Awards	2015	Best Television Comedy	Modern Family	Nominated	
Screenwriters Choice Awards	2016	Best Television Comedy	Modern Family	Nominated	
Teen Choice Awards	2010	Choice TV Show: Comedy	Modern Family	Nominated	
Teen Choice Awards	2010	Choice TV: Breakout Show	Modern Family	Nominated	
Teen Choice Awards	2010	Choice TV: Male Breakout Star	Rico Rodriguez	Nominated	
Teen Choice Awards	2010	Choice TV: Female Breakout Star	Sarah Hyland	Nominated	
Teen Choice Awards	2011	Choice TV Show: Comedy	Modern Family	Nominated	
Teen Choice Awards	2011	Choice TV Actor: Comedy	Ty Burrell	Nominated	
Teen Choice Awards	2011	Choice TV: Male Scene Stealer	Rico Rodriguez	Nominated	
Teen Choice Awards	2011	Choice TV: Male Scene Stealer	Eric Stonestreet	Nominated	
Teen Choice Awards	2011	Choice TV: Female Scene Stealer	Sofía Vergara	Nominated	
Teen Choice Awards	2012	Choice TV Show: Comedy	Modern Family	Nominated	
Teen Choice Awards	2012	Choice TV Actor: Comedy	Ty Burrell	Nominated	
Teen Choice Awards	2012	Choice TV Actress: Comedy	Sofía Vergara	Nominated	
Teen Choice Awards	2012	Choice TV: Female Scene Stealer	Sarah Hyland	Nominated	
Teen Choice Awards	2013	Choice TV Show: Comedy	Modern Family	Nominated	
Teen Choice Awards	2013	Choice TV Actor: Comedy	Eric Stonestreet	Nominated	
Teen Choice Awards	2013	Choice TV: Male Scene Stealer	Rico Rodriguez	Nominated	
Teen Choice Awards	2013	Choice TV: Female Scene Stealer	Ariel Winter	Nominated	
Teen Choice Awards	2014	Choice TV: Male Scene Stealer	Adam DeVine	Nominated	
Teen Choice Awards	2014	Choice TV: Female Scene Stealer	Sarah Hyland	Nominated	
Teen Choice Awards	2016	Choice TV Show: Comedy	Modern Family	Nominated	
Teen Choice Awards	2018	Choice TV Show: Comedy	Modern Family	Nominated	
Teen Choice Awards	2018	Choice TV Actor: Comedy	Rico Rodriguez	Nominated	
Teen Choice Awards	2018	Choice TV Actress: Comedy	Sarah Hyland	Nominated	
Television Critics Association Awards	2010	Program of the Year	Modern Family	Nominated	
Television Critics Association Awards	2010	Outstanding Achievement in Comedy	Modern Family	Won	
Television Critics Association Awards	2010	Outstanding New Program	Modern Family	Nominated	
Television Critics Association Awards	2010	Individual Achievement in Comedy	Ty Burrell	Nominated	
Television Critics Association Awards	2010	Individual Achievement in Comedy	Eric Stonestreet	Nominated	
Television Critics Association Awards	2011	Outstanding Achievement in Comedy	Modern Family	Won	
Television Critics Association Awards	2011	Individual Achievement in Comedy	Ty Burrell	Won (Note: Tied with Nick Offerman for Parks and Recreation)	
Television Critics Association Awards	2012	Outstanding Achievement in Comedy	Modern Family	Nominated	
Women's Image Network Awards	2013	Outstanding Comedy Series	Modern Family (for "The Future Dunphys")	Won	
Women's Image Network Awards	2013	Outstanding Film or Show Directed by a Woman	Ryan Case	Nominated	
Women's Image Network Awards	2013	Outstanding Film or Show Written by a Woman	Elaine Ko	Nominated	
Women's Image Network Awards	2014	Outstanding Comedy Series	Modern Family (for "Under Pressure")	Nominated	
Women's Image Network Awards	2014	Outstanding Actress – Comedy Series	Julie Bowen (for "Under Pressure")	Nominated	
Women's Image Network Awards	2014	Outstanding Comedy Series Directed by a Woman	Alisa Statman (for "The Wedding Part 2")	Won	
Women's Image Network Awards	2014	Outstanding Comedy Series Written by a Woman	Megan Ganz (for "The Wedding Part 2")	Nominated	
Women's Image Network Awards	2014	Outstanding Comedy Series Written by a Woman	Elaine Ko (for "Under Pressure")	Nominated	
Women's Image Network Awards	2016	Outstanding Show Directed by a Woman	Ryan Case (for "Closet? You'll Love It!")	Nominated	
Writers Guild of America Awards	2010	Television: Comedy Series	Modern Family (Note: Nominees: Paul Corrigan, Sameer Gardezi, Joe Lawson, Steven Levitan, Christopher Lloyd, Dan O'Shannon, Brad Walsh, Caroline Williams, Bill Wrubel, and Danny Zuker)	Nominated	
Writers Guild of America Awards	2010	Television: New Series	Modern Family	Won	
Writers Guild of America Awards	2010	Television: Episodic Comedy	Steven Levitan and Christopher Lloyd (for "Pilot")	Won (Note: Tied with Robert Carlock for "Apollo, Apollo" from 30 Rock)	
Writers Guild of America Awards	2011	Television: Comedy Series	Modern Family (Note: Nominees: Jerry Collins, Paul Corrigan, Alex Herschlag, Abraham Higginbotham, Elaine Ko, Joe Lawson, Steven Levitan, Christopher Lloyd, Dan O'Shannon, Jeffrey Richman, Brad Walsh, Ilana Wernick, Bill Wrubel, and Danny Zuker)	Won	
Writers Guild of America Awards	2011	Television: Episodic Comedy	Paul Corrigan and Brad Walsh (for "Earthquake")	Nominated	
Writers Guild of America Awards	2011	Television: Episodic Comedy	Danny Zuker (for "Starry Night")	Nominated	
Writers Guild of America Awards	2012	Television: Comedy Series	Modern Family (Note: Nominees: Cindy Chupack, Paul Corrigan, Abraham Higginbotham, Ben Karlin, Elaine Ko, Carol Leifer, Steven Levitan, Christopher Lloyd, Dan O'Shannon, Jeffrey Richman, Brad Walsh, Ilana Wernick, Bill Wrubel, and Danny Zuker)	Won	
Writers Guild of America Awards	2012	Television: Episodic Comedy	Steven Levitan and Jeffrey Richman (for "Caught in the Act")	Won	
Writers Guild of America Awards	2012	Television: Episodic Comedy	Dan O'Shannon and Ilana Wernick (for "Mother's Day")	Nominated	
Writers Guild of America Awards	2013	Television: Comedy Series	Modern Family (Note: Nominees: Cindy Chupack, Paul Corrigan, Abraham Higginbotham, Ben Karlin, Elaine Ko, Steven Levitan, Christopher Lloyd, Dan O'Shannon, Jeffrey Richman, Audra Sielaff, Brad Walsh, Bill Wrubel, and Danny Zuker)	Nominated	
Writers Guild of America Awards	2013	Television: Episodic Comedy	Cindy Chupack (for "Little Bo Bleep")	Nominated	
Writers Guild of America Awards	2013	Television: Episodic Comedy	Jeffrey Richman (for "Mistery Date")	Nominated	
Writers Guild of America Awards	2013	Television: Episodic Comedy	Elaine Ko (for "Virgin Territory")	Won	
Writers Guild of America Awards	2014	Television: Comedy Series	Modern Family (Note: Nominees: Paul Corrigan, Bianca Douglas, Megan Ganz, Abraham Higginbotham, Ben Karlin, Elaine Ko, Steven Levitan, Christopher Lloyd, Becky Mann, Dan O'Shannon, Jeffrey Richman, Audra Sielaff, Emily Spivey, Brad Walsh, Bill Wrubel, and Danny Zuker)	Nominated	
Writers Guild of America Awards	2014	Television: Episodic Comedy	Paul Corrigan and Brad Walsh (for "Career Day")	Nominated	
Writers Guild of America Awards	2014	Television: Episodic Comedy	Elaine Ko (for "Farm Strong")	Nominated	
Writers Guild of America Awards	2015	Television: Episodic Comedy	Abraham Higginbotham, Steven Levitan, and Jeffrey Richman (for "Three Dinners")	Nominated	
Writers Guild of America Awards	2015	Television: Episodic Comedy	Rick Wiener and Kenny Schwartz (for "The Cold")	Nominated	
Writers Guild of America Awards	2016	Television: Episodic Comedy	Megan Ganz and Steven Levitan (for "Connection Lost")	Nominated	
Young Artist Awards	2010	Outstanding Young Performers in a TV Series	Rico Rodriguez, Nolan Gould, and Ariel Winter	Won	
Young Artist Awards	2011	Outstanding Young Ensemble in a TV Series	Rico Rodriguez, Nolan Gould, and Ariel Winter	Nominated	
Young Artist Awards	2014	Best Performance in a TV Series – Guest Starring Young Actress 11–13	Brielle Barbusca	Nominated	
Young Artist Awards	2014	Best Performance in a TV Series – Guest Starring Young Actress 11–13	Paris Smith	Nominated	
Young Artist Awards	2019	Best Performance in a TV Series – Recurring Young Actor	Marcello Reyes	Nominated	
Young Artist Awards	2019	Best Performance in a TV Series – Guest Starring Teen Artist	Ruby Jay	Nominated	
Young Hollywood Awards	2014	Best Cast Chemistry – TV	Modern Family	Nominated	

=== Total awards and nominations for the main cast ===
Total awards and nominations for the main cast
Actor	Character	Nominations	Awards
Sofía Vergara	Gloria Delgado-Pritchett	37	8
Ty Burrell	Phil Dunphy	24	7
Julie Bowen	Claire Dunphy	19	7
Eric Stonestreet	Cameron Tucker	19	6
Rico Rodriguez	Manny Delgado	17	9
Sarah Hyland	Haley Dunphy	15	5
Ed O'Neill	Jay Pritchett	15	4
Jesse Tyler Ferguson	Mitchell Pritchett	14	4
Nolan Gould	Luke Dunphy	13	7
Ariel Winter	Alex Dunphy	10	5
Aubrey Anderson-Emmons	Lily Tucker-Pritchett	6	3
Jeremy Maguire	Joe Pritchett	2	0
Reid Ewing	Dylan Marshall	0	0

=== Emmy awards and nominations for the cast ===
Emmy awards and nominations for the cast
Actor	Character	Seasons										
Actor	Character	1	2	3	4	5	6	7	8	9	10	11
Ed O'Neill	Jay Pritchett	—N/a	Nominated	Nominated	Nominated	—N/a	—N/a	—N/a	—N/a	—N/a	—N/a	—N/a
Sofía Vergara	Gloria Delgado-Pritchett	Nominated	Nominated	Nominated	Nominated	—N/a	—N/a	—N/a	—N/a	—N/a	—N/a	—N/a
Julie Bowen	Claire Dunphy	Nominated	Won	Won	Nominated	Nominated	Nominated	—N/a	—N/a	—N/a	—N/a	—N/a
Ty Burrell	Phil Dunphy	Nominated	Won	Nominated	Nominated	Won	Nominated	Nominated	Nominated	—N/a	—N/a	—N/a
Jesse Tyler Ferguson	Mitchell Pritchett	Nominated	Nominated	Nominated	Nominated	Nominated	—N/a	—N/a	—N/a	—N/a	—N/a	—N/a
Eric Stonestreet	Cameron Tucker	Won	Nominated	Won	—N/a	—N/a	—N/a	—N/a	—N/a	—N/a	—N/a	—N/a
Fred Willard	Frank Dunphy	Nominated	—N/a	—N/a	—N/a	—N/a	—N/a	—N/a	—N/a	—N/a	—N/a	Nominated
Nathan Lane	Pepper Saltzman	—N/a	Nominated	—N/a	Nominated	Nominated	—N/a	—N/a	—N/a	—N/a	—N/a	—N/a
Greg Kinnear	Tad	—N/a	—N/a	Nominated	—N/a	—N/a	—N/a	—N/a	—N/a	—N/a	—N/a	—N/a
Elizabeth Banks	Sal	—N/a	—N/a	—N/a	—N/a	—N/a	Nominated	—N/a	—N/a	—N/a	—N/a	—N/a

=== Screen Actors Guild awards and nominations for the cast ===
Screen Actors Guild awards and nominations for the cast
Actor	Character	Years										
Actor	Character	2010	2011	2012	2013	2014	2015	2016	2017	2018	2019	2020
Ed O'Neill	Jay Pritchett	—N/a	Nominated	—N/a	—N/a	—N/a	—N/a	—N/a	—N/a	—N/a	—N/a	—N/a
Sofía Vergara	Gloria Delgado-Pritchett	—N/a	Nominated	Nominated	Nominated	—N/a	—N/a	—N/a	—N/a	—N/a	—N/a	—N/a
Julie Bowen	Claire Dunphy	—N/a	—N/a	Nominated	—N/a	Nominated	Nominated	—N/a	—N/a	—N/a	—N/a	—N/a
Ty Burrell	Phil Dunphy	—N/a	Nominated	Nominated	Nominated	Won	Nominated	Nominated	Nominated	—N/a	—N/a	—N/a
Eric Stonestreet	Cameron Tucker	—N/a	—N/a	Nominated	Nominated	—N/a	Nominated	—N/a	—N/a	—N/a	—N/a	—N/a

=== Major guild awards and nominations ===
Major guild awards and nominations for the series
Guild	Award	Years										
Guild	Award	2010	2011	2012	2013	2014	2015	2016	2017	2018	2019	2020
Directors Guild of America	Outstanding Directorial Achievement in Comedy Series	Won	Won (two nominations)	Nominated (twice)	Nominated	Nominated (twice)	Nominated	Nominated	—N/a			
Producers Guild of America	Outstanding Producer of Episodic Television – Comedy	—N/a	Won	Won	Won	Won	Nominated	Nominated	Nominated	—N/a		
Screen Actors Guild (SAG-AFTRA)	Outstanding Performance by an Ensemble in a Comedy Series	Nominated	Won	Won	Won	Won	Nominated	Nominated	Nominated	—N/a		
Writers Guild of America	Television: Comedy Series	Nominated	Won	Won	Nominated	Nominated	—N/a					
Writers Guild of America	Television: Episodic Comedy	Won	Nominated (twice)	Won (two nominations)	Won (three nominations)	Nominated (twice)	Nominated (twice)	Nominated	—N/a			
