= Cinema Audio Society Award for Outstanding Achievement in Sound Mixing for Television Series – Half Hour =

Annual US television award

- Country: United States
- Presented by: Cinema Audio Society
- Currently held by: David Lascelles, Sean Byrne, Ryan Kennedy, George Murphy, Brent Findley, Jamison Rabbe, Arno Stephanian – Ted Lasso (2021)

The Cinema Audio Society Award for Outstanding Achievement in Sound Mixing for Television Series – Half Hour is an annual award given by the Cinema Audio Society to live action motion picture sound mixer for their outstanding achievements in sound mixing. The award came to its current title in 2013, when one hour and half hour series were separated into two categories. Before this, the category was labeled Outstanding Achievement in Sound Mixing for Television Series, and was given annually starting in 1994, for series' episodes aired the previous year.

== Winners and nominees ==
=== 1990s ===
Outstanding Achievement in Sound Mixing for Television

Year	Program	Episode(s)	Nominees	Network
1993 (1st)	Star Trek: The Next Generation	"Descent, Parts 1 & 2"	Alan Bernard (production mixer); Chris Haire, Doug Davey, Richard L. Morrison (re-recording mixers)	Syndicated
1993 (1st)	Lois & Clark: The New Adventures of Superman	"Pilot"	Kenn Fuller (production mixer); David E. Fluhr, John Asman, Melissa Sherwood Hofmann (re-recording mixers)	ABC
1993 (1st)	NYPD Blue	"Pilot"	Mark Server (production mixer); Robert Appere, Kenneth R. Burton, Gary D. Rogers, Dan Hiland (re-recording mixer)	ABC
1993 (1st)	Northern Exposure	"Kaddish for Uncle Manny"	Robert Marts (production mixer); R. Russell Smith, Greg Orloff, Anthony D'Amico (re-recording mixers)	CBS
1993 (1st)	Return to Lonesome Dove	"The Vision"	Clark King, Donald F. Johnson (production mixers); Thomas J. Huth, Sam Black, David M. Weishaar (re-recording mixers)	CBS

Outstanding Achievement in Sound Mixing for Television - Series

Year	Program	Episode(s)	Nominees	Network
1994 (2nd)	NYPD Blue	"Simone Says"	Joe Kenworthy (production mixer); Robert Appere, Kenneth R. Burton (re-recording mixers)	ABC
1994 (2nd)	ER	"Blizzard"	Russell C. Fager (production mixer); Allen L. Stone, Franklin Jones Jr., Michael Jiron (re-recording mixers)	NBC
1994 (2nd)	Lois & Clark: The New Adventures of Superman	"Wall of Sound"	Kenn Fuller (production mixer); Dan Hiland, Joseph D. Citarella (re-recording mixers)	ABC
1994 (2nd)	Northern Exposure	"Fish Story"	Robert Marts, Glenn Micallef (production mixers); R. Russell Smith, Greg Orloff, Anthony D'Amico (re-recording mixers)	CBS
1994 (2nd)	Star Trek: The Next Generation	"Genesis"	Alan Bernard (production mixer); Chris Haire, Doug Davey, Richard L. Morrison (re-recording mixers)	Syndicated
1995 (3rd)	ER	"Hell and High Water"	Will Yarbrough (production mixer); Allen L. Stone, Franklin Jones Jr., Michael Jiron (re-recording mixers)	NBC
1995 (3rd)	American Gothic	"Damned If You Don't"	Richard Van Dyke (production mixer); David E. Fluhr, John Asman, Sam Black (re-recording mixers)	CBS
1995 (3rd)	Murder One	"Chapter Three"	Susan Moore-Chong (production mixer); Robert Appere, Kenneth R. Burton (re-recording mixers)	ABC
1995 (3rd)	NYPD Blue	"Heavin' Can Wait"	Joe Kenworthy (production mixer); Robert Appere, Kenneth R. Burton (re-recording mixers)	ABC
1995 (3rd)	The X-Files	"Humbug"	Michael T. Williamson (production mixer); Marti D. Humphrey, Gary D. Rogers (re-recording mixers)	Fox
1996 (4th)	NYPD Blue	"Unembraceable You"	Joe Kenworthy (production mixer); Robert Appere, Kenneth R. Burton (re-recording mixers)	ABC
1996 (4th)	Babylon 5	"Severed Dreams"	Linda Coffey (production mixer); Terry O'Bright, Keith Rogers (re-recording mixers)	PTEN
1996 (4th)	Chicago Hope	"Quiet Riot"	Russell C. Fager (production mixer); Greg Orloff, R. Russell Smith (re-recording mixers)	CBS
1996 (4th)	ER	"Fear of Flying"	Lowell Harris (production mixer); Allen L. Stone, Franklin Jones Jr., Michael Jiron (re-recording mixers)	NBC
1996 (4th)	The X-Files	"Tunguska"	Michael T. Williamson (production mixer); David John West, Nello Torri, Doug E. Turner (re-recording mixers)	Fox
1997 (5th)	Chicago Hope	"Brain Salad Surgery"	Russell C. Fager (production mixer); R. Russell Smith, William Freesh (re-recording mixers)	CBS
1997 (5th)	NYPD Blue	"Dead Man Talking"	Joe Kenworthy (production mixer); Robert Appere, Kenneth R. Burton (re-recording mixers)	ABC
1997 (5th)	Nash Bridges	"Sniper"	Agamemnon Andrianos (production mixer); Sherry Klein, Robert Edmondson, Joel Fein (re-recording mixer)	CBS
1997 (5th)	Star Trek: Voyager	"Future's End"	Alan Bernard (production mixer); Chris Haire, Doug Davey, Richard L. Morrison (re-recording mixers)	UPN
1997 (5th)	The X-Files	"The Post-Modern Prometheus"	Michael T. Williamson (production mixer); David John West, Harry Andronis, Kurt Kassulke (re-recording mixers)	Fox
1998 (6th)	Buffy the Vampire Slayer	"Lovers Walk"	David Yaffe (production mixer); Kevin Patrick Burns, Todd Orr, Ron Evans (re-recording mixers)	The WB
1998 (6th)	Ally McBeal	"Making Spirits Bright"	Paul Lewis (production mixer); Nello Torri, Peter Kelsey (re-recording mixer)	Fox
1998 (6th)	Chicago Hope	"One Hundred and One Damnations"	Russell C. Fager (production mixer); R. Russell Smith, William Freesh (re-recording mixers)	CBS
1998 (6th)	JAG	"Gypsy Eyes"	Sean Rush (production mixer); Tim Philben, Ross Davis, Grover B. Helsley (re-recording mixer)	CBS
1998 (6th)	ER	"Exodus"	Lowell Harris (production mixer); Allen L. Stone, Franklin Jones Jr., Michael Jiron (re-recording mixers)	NBC
1998 (6th)	NYPD Blue	"Hearts and Souls"	Joe Kenworthy (production mixer); Elmo Ponsdomenech, J. Stanley Johnston (re-recording mixers)	ABC
1999 (7th)	The Sopranos	"I Dream of Jeannie Cusamano"	Mathew Price (production mixer); Adam Sawelson, Todd Orr, Ron Evans (re-recording mixers)	HBO
1999 (7th)	ER	"The Storm (Part II)"	Marc A. Gilmartin (production mixer); Allen L. Stone, Dave Concors, Michael Jiron (re-recording mixer)	NBC
1999 (7th)	The West Wing	"In Excelsis Deo"	Kenneth B. Ross (production mixer); Gary D. Rogers, Dan Hiland (re-recording mixers)	NBC
1999 (7th)	Star Trek: Voyager	"Equinox, Part I"	Alan Bernard (production mixer); Chris Haire, Doug Davey, Richard L. Morrison (re-recording mixers)	UPN
1999 (7th)	The X-Files	"The Unnatural"	Steve Cantamessa (production mixer); David John West, Harry Andronis, Kurt Kassulke (re-recording mixers)	Fox

=== 2000s ===
Year	Program	Episode(s)	Nominees	Network
2000 (8th)	The West Wing	"In the Shadow of Two Gunmen, Parts I & II"	Mark Weingarten (production mixer); Gary D. Rogers, Dan Hiland (re-recording mixers)	NBC
2000 (8th)	CSI: Crime Scene Investigation	"Crate 'n Burial"	Michael Fowler (production mixer); Larry Benjamin, Ross Davis, Grover B. Helsley (re-recording mixers)	CBS
2000 (8th)	The Sopranos	"Commendatori"	Mathew Price (production mixer); Todd Orr, Kevin Patrick Burns, (re-recording mixers)	HBO
2000 (8th)	Law & Order	"Standoff"	Richard Murphy (production mixer); Bill Nicholson, Thomas Meloeny (re-recording mixers)	NBC
2000 (8th)	Star Trek: Voyager	"Unimatrix Zero"	Alan Bernard (production mixer); Chris Haire, Doug Davey, Richard L. Morrison (re-recording mixers)	UPN
2001 (9th)	Six Feet Under	"Pilot"	Richard Van Dyke (production mixer); Peter Reale, Roberta Doheny (re-recording mixers)	HBO
2001 (9th)	CSI: Crime Scene Investigation	"Caged"	Michael Fowler (production mixer); Yuri Reese, William Smith (re-recording mixers)	CBS
2001 (9th)	Law & Order	"Soldier of Fortune"	Richard Murphy (production mixer); Bill Nicholson, Thomas Meloeny (re-recording mixers)	NBC
2001 (9th)	NYPD Blue	"Johnny Got His Gold"	Joe Kenworthy (production mixer); Pete Elia, J. Stanley Johnston (re-recording mixers)	ABC
2001 (9th)	The Sopranos	"Pine Barrens"	Mathew Price (production mixer); Todd Orr, Kevin Patrick Burns, Fred Tator (re-recording mixers)	HBO
2002 (10th)	The West Wing	"Posse Comitatus"	Patrick Hanson (production mixer); Gary D. Rogers, Dan Hiland (re-recording mixers)	NBC
2002 (10th)	24	"11:00 p.m. – 12:00 a.m."	William Gocke (production mixer); Mike Olman, Kenneth Kobett (re-recording mixers)	Fox
2002 (10th)	The X-Files	"The Truth"	Steve Cantamessa (production mixer); David John West, Harry Andronis, Brian Harman (re-recording mixers)	Fox
2002 (10th)	Alias	"Cipher"	Douglas Axtell (production mixer); Robert Appere, Ed Carr (re-recording mixers)	ABC
2002 (10th)	CSI: Crime Scene Investigation	"Fight Night"	Michael Fowler (production mixer); Yuri Reese, William Smith (re-recording mixers)	CBS
2002 (10th)	Six Feet Under	"The Last Time"	Steven A. Morrow (production mixer); Peter Reale, Roberta Doheny (re-recording mixers)	HBO
2003 (11th)	24	"Day 3: 5:00 p.m. - 6:00 p.m."	William Gocke (production mixer); Mike Olman, Kenneth Kobett (re-recording mixers)	Fox
2003 (11th)	Alias	"Succession"	Douglas Axtell (production mixer); Robert Appere, Ed Carr (re-recording mixers)	ABC
2003 (11th)	NYPD Blue	"Shear Stupidity"	Joe Kenworthy (production mixer); Pete Elia, Kurt Kassulke (re-recording mixers)	ABC
2003 (11th)	Six Feet Under	"I'm Sorry, I'm Lost"	Bo Harwood (production mixer); Elmo Ponsdomenech, Joe Earle (re-recording mixers)	HBO
2003 (11th)	CSI: Crime Scene Investigation	"Grissom Versus the Volcano"	Michael Fowler (production mixer); Yuri Reese, William Smith (re-recording mixers)	CBS
2004 (12th)	Deadwood	"Deadwood"	Geoffrey Patterson (production mixer); William Freesh, R. Russell Smith (re-recording mixers)	HBO
2004 (12th)	24	"Day 3: 6:00 a.m. - 7:00 a.m."	William Gocke (production mixer); Mike Olman, Kenneth Kobett (re-recording mixers)	Fox
2004 (12th)	The Sopranos	"Irregular Around the Margins"	Mathew Price (production mixer); Todd Orr, Kevin Patrick Burns (re-recording mixers)	HBO
2004 (12th)	Alias	"Unveiled"	Douglas Axtell (production mixer); Robert Appere, Ed Carr (re-recording mixers)	ABC
2004 (12th)	Lost	"Pilot (Part 1)"	David Yaffe (production mixer); Scott Weber, Frank Morrone (re-recording mixers)	ABC
2005 (13th)	Deadwood	"A Lie Agreed Upon (Part I)"	Geoffrey Patterson (production mixer); William Freesh, R. Russell Smith (re-recording mixers)	HBO
2005 (13th)	24	"Day 4: 6:00 a.m. - 7:00 a.m."	William Gocke (production mixer); Mike Olman, Kenneth Kobett (re-recording mixers)	Fox
2005 (13th)	CSI: Crime Scene Investigation	"Grave Danger: Part 2"	Michael Fowler (production mixer); Yuri Reese, William Smith (re-recording mixers)	CBS
2005 (13th)	Rome	"The Spoils"	Maurizio Argentieri (production mixer); William Freesh, R. Russell Smith (re-recording mixers)	HBO
2005 (13th)	The West Wing	"2162 Votes"	Patrick Hanson (production mixer); Gary D. Rogers, Dan Hiland (re-recording mixers)	NBC
2006 (14th)	Deadwood	"A Two-Headed Beast"	Geoffrey Patterson (production mixer); William Freesh, R. Russell Smith (re-recording mixers)	HBO
2006 (14th)	24	"Day 5: 7:00 a.m. - 8:00 a.m."	William Gocke (production mixer); Mike Olman, Kenneth Kobett (re-recording mixers)	Fox
2006 (14th)	Heroes	"Genesis"	Kenn Fuller (production mixer); Gerry Lentz, Richard Weingart (re-recording mixers)	NBC
2006 (14th)	Lost	"I Do"	Robert J. Anderson Jr. (production mixer); Scott Weber, Frank Morrone (re-recording mixers)	ABC
2006 (14th)	The Sopranos	"Members Only"	Mathew Price (production mixer); Todd Orr, Kevin Patrick Burns (re-recording mixers)	HBO
2007 (15th)	CSI: Crime Scene Investigation	"Living Doll"	Michael Fowler (production mixer); Yuri Reese, William Smith (re-recording mixers)	CBS
2007 (15th)	24	"Day 6: 10:00 p.m. – 11:00 p.m."	William Gocke (production mixer); Mike Olman, Kenneth Kobett (re-recording mixers)	Fox
2007 (15th)	Jericho	"Why We Fight"	Phillip W. Palmer (production mixer); Sherry Klein, Fred Tator (re-recording mixers)	CBS
2007 (15th)	Scrubs	"My Musical"	Joe Foglia (production mixer); John W. Cook II, Peter Nusbaum (re-recording mixerS)	NBC
2007 (15th)	The Sopranos	"The Blue Comet"	Mathew Price (production mixer); Todd Orr, Kevin Patrick Burns (re-recording mixers)	HBO
2008 (16th)	24	"Redemption"	William Gocke (production mixer); Mike Olman, Kenneth Kobett (re-recording mixers)	Fox
2008 (16th)	Dexter	"Turning Biminese"	Roger Pietschmann (production mixer); Elmo Ponsdomenech, Kevin Roache (re-recording mixers)	Showtime
2008 (16th)	House	"Last Resort"	Von Varga (production mixer); Gerry Lentz, Richard Weingart (re-recording mixers)	Fox
2008 (16th)	Lost	"Meet Kevin Johnson"	Robert J. Anderson Jr. (production mixer); Scott Weber, Frank Morrone (re-recording mixers)	ABC
2008 (16th)	Mad Men	"The Jet Set"	Peter Bentley (production mixer); Ken Teaney, Geoffrey G. Rubay (re-recording mixers)	AMC
2009 (17th)	Mad Men	"Guy Walks Into an Advertising Agency"	Peter Bentley (production mixer); Ken Teaney, Geoffrey G. Rubay (re-recording mixers)	AMC
2009 (17th)	24	"Day 7: 10:00 p.m. - 11:00 p.m."	William Gocke (production mixer); Mike Olman, Kenneth Kobett (re-recording mixers)	Fox
2009 (17th)	Glee	"Wheels"	Phillip W. Palmer (production mixer); Joe Earle, Doug Andham (re-recording mixers)	Fox
2009 (17th)	Battlestar Galactica	"Daybreak, Part 2"	Rick Bal (production mixer); Mike Olman, Kenneth Kobett (re-recording mixers)	Sci-Fi
2009 (17th)	Desperate Housewives	"Boom Crunch"	Agamemnon Andrianos (production mixer); Mike Olman, Kenneth Kobett (re-recording mixers)	ABC

=== 2010s ===
Year	Program	Episode(s)	Nominees	Network
2010 (18th)	Boardwalk Empire	"A Return to Normalcy"	Frank Stettner (production mixer), Tom Fleischman (re-recording mixer)	HBO
2010 (18th)	24	"Day 8: 3:00 p.m. - 4:00 p.m."	William Gocke (production mixer); Mike Olman, Kenneth Kobett (re-recording mixers)	Fox
2010 (18th)	Glee	"The Power of Madonna"	Phillip W. Palmer (production mixer); Joe Earle, Doug Andham (re-recording mixers)	Fox
2010 (18th)	Dexter	"Take It!"	Greg Agalsoff (production mixer); Pete Elia, Kevin Roache (re-recording mixers)	Showtime
2010 (18th)	Modern Family	"Chirp"	Stephen Tibbo (production mixer), Dean Okrand (re-recording mixer)	ABC
2011 (19th)	Boardwalk Empire	"To the Lost"	Frank Stettner (production mixer), Tom Fleischman (re-recording mixer)	HBO
2011 (19th)	Breaking Bad	"Face Off"	Darryl L. Frank (production mixer); Jeffrey Perkins, Eric Justen (re-recording mixers)	AMC
2011 (19th)	The Walking Dead	"What Lies Ahead"	Bartek Swiatek (production mixer); Gary D. Rogers, Dan Hiland (re-recording mixers)	AMC
2011 (19th)	Dexter	"Just Let Go"	Greg Agalsoff (production mixer); Pete Elia, Kevin Roache (re-recording mixers)	Showtime
2011 (19th)	Game of Thrones	"Baelor"	Ronan Hill (production mixer), Mark Taylor (re-recording mixer)	HBO

Outstanding Achievement in Sound Mixing for Television Series – Half Hour

Year	Program	Episode(s)	Nominees	Network
2012 (20th)	Modern Family	"Disneyland"	Stephen Tibbo (production mixer); Dean Okrand, Brian Harman (re-recording mixers)	ABC
2012 (20th)	30 Rock	"Mazel Tov, Dummies!"	Griffin Richardson (production mixer), Tony Pipitone (re-recording mixer)	NBC
2012 (20th)	The Office	"New Guys"	Benjamin Patrick (production mixer); John W. Cook II, Kenneth Kobett (re-recording mixers)	NBC
2012 (20th)	Californication	"Hell Ain't a Bad Place to Be "	Harrison D. Marsh (production mixer); Todd Grace, Ed Carr (re-recording mixers)	Showtime
2012 (20th)	Nurse Jackie	"Handle Your Scandal"	Jan McLaughlin (production mixer), Peter Waggoner (re-recording mixer)	Showtime
2013 (21st)	Modern Family	"Goodnight Gracie"	Stephen Tibbo (production mixer); Dean Okrand, Brian Harman (re-recording mixers)	ABC
2013 (21st)	Californication	"I'll Lay My Monsters Down "	Daniel P. Church (production mixer); Todd Grace, Ed Carr (re-recording mixers)	Showtime
2013 (21st)	Nurse Jackie	"Teachable Moments"	Jan McLaughlin (production mixer), Peter Waggoner (re-recording mixer)	Showtime
2013 (21st)	Parks and Recreation	"Leslie and Ben"	Steve Morantz (production mixer); John W. Cook II, Kenneth Kobett (re-recording mixers)	NBC
2013 (21st)	The Office	"Finale"	Benjamin Patrick (production mixer); John W. Cook II, Robert Carr (re-recording mixers)	NBC
2014 (22nd)	Modern Family	"Australia"	Stephen Tibbo (production mixer); Dean Okrand, Brian Harman (re-recording mixers)	ABC
2014 (22nd)	Family Guy	"The Simpsons Guy"	Patrick S. Clark (production mixer); Jim Fitzpatrick, Armin Steiner (re-recording mixers)	Fox
2014 (22nd)	Nurse Jackie	"The Lady with the Lamp"	Jan McLaughlin (production mixer), Peter Waggoner (re-recording mixer)	Showtime
2014 (22nd)	Parks and Recreation	"Moving Up"	Steve Morantz (production mixer); John W. Cook II, Kenneth Kobett (re-recording mixers)	NBC
2014 (22nd)	Veep	"Detroit"	William F. MacPherson (production mixer), Richard Davey (re-recording mixer)	HBO
2015 (23rd)	Modern Family	"Connection Lost"	Stephen Tibbo (production mixer); Dean Okrand, Brian Harman (re-recording mixers); David Torres (foley mixer)	ABC
2015 (23rd)	Nurse Jackie	"Managed Care"	Jan McLaughlin (production mixer), Peter Waggoner (re-recording mixer)	Showtime
2015 (23rd)	Parks and Recreation	"One Last Ride: Part 1"	George Flores (production mixer); John W. Cook II, William Freesh (re-recording mixers)	NBC
2015 (23rd)	Silicon Valley	"Server Space"	Benjamin Patrick (production mixer); Elmo Ponsdomenech, Todd Beckett (re-recording mixers)	HBO
2015 (23rd)	Veep	"Mommy Meyer"	William F. MacPherson (production mixer), Richard Davey (re-recording mixer)	HBO
2016 (24th)	Modern Family	"The Storm"	Stephen Tibbo (production mixer); Dean Okrand, Brian Harman (re-recording mixers)	ABC
2016 (24th)	Transparent	"Exciting and New"	Sam Hamer (production mixer); Andy D'Addario, Gary Gegan (re-recording mixers)	Amazon
2016 (24th)	Silicon Valley	"Daily Active Users"	Benjamin Patrick (production mixer); Elmo Ponsdomenech, Todd Beckett (re-recording mixers)	HBO
2016 (24th)	Veep	"Congressional Ball"	William F. MacPherson (production mixer); John W. Cook II, William Freesh (re-recording mixers)	HBO
2016 (24th)	Black-ish	"God"	Tom Stasinis (production mixer); Peter Nusbaum, Whitney Purple (re-recording mixers)	ABC
2017 (25th)	Silicon Valley	"Hooli-Con"	Benjamin Patrick (production mixer); Elmo Ponsdomenech, Todd Beckett (re-recording mixers)	HBO
2017 (25th)	Black-ish	"Juneteenth"	Tom Stasinis (production mixer); Peter Nusbaum, Whitney Purple (re-recording mixers)	ABC
2017 (25th)	Modern Family	"Lake Life"	Stephen Tibbo (production mixer); Dean Okrand, Brian Harman (re-recording mixers)	ABC
2017 (25th)	Ballers	"Yay Area"	Scott Harber (production mixer); Richard Weingart, Michael Colomby, Mitch Dorf (re-recording mixers)	HBO
2017 (25th)	Veep	"Omaha"	William F. MacPherson (production mixer); John W. Cook II, William Freesh (re-recording mixers)	HBO
2018 (26th)	Mozart in the Jungle	"Domo Arigato"	Ryotaro Harada (production mixer); Andy D'Addario, Chris M. Jacobson (re-recording mixers); Patrick Christensen (adr mixer); Gary DeLeone (foley mixer)	Amazon
2018 (26th)	Ballers	"The Kids Are Aight"	Scott Harber (production mixer); Richard Weingart, Michael Colomby (re-recording mixers); Michael Miller (adr mixer); James B. Howe (foley moxer)	HBO
2018 (26th)	Barry	"Chapter Seven: Loud, Fast, and Keep Going"	Benjamin Patrick (production mixer); Elmo Ponsdomenech, Todd Beckett (re-recording mixers); David Wingo (scoring mixer); Aaron Hasson (adr mixer); John Sanacore (foley mixer)	HBO
2018 (26th)	Silicon Valley	"Fifty-One Percent"	Benjamin Patrick (production mixer); Elmo Ponsdomenech, Todd Beckett (re-recording mixers); Oren Hadar (scoring mixer); Aaron Hasson (adr mixer); Aran Tanchum (foley mixer)	HBO
2018 (26th)	Modern Family	"Did the Chicken Cross the Road?"	Stephen Tibbo (production mixer); Dean Okrand, Brian Harman (re-recording mixers); Matt Hovland (adr mixer); David Torres (foley mixer)	ABC
2019 (27th)	Barry	"ronny/lily"	Benjamin Patrick (production mixer); Elmo Ponsdomenech, Jason “Frenchie” Gaya (re-recording mixers); Aaron Hasson (adr mixer); John Sanacore (foley mixer)	HBO
2019 (27th)	Fleabag	"Episode 6"	Christian Bourne (production mixer), David Drake (re-recording mixer), James Gregory (adr mixer)	Amazon
2019 (27th)	Modern Family	"A Year of Birthdays"	Stephen Tibbo (production mixer); Dean Okrand, Brian Harman (re-recording mixers); Matt Hovland (adr mixer); David Torres (foley mixer)	ABC
2019 (27th)	Russian Doll	"The Way Out"	Phil Rosati (production mixer); Lewis Goldstein, Thomas Ryan (re-recording mixers); Jerrell Suelto (adr mixer); Wen Hsuan-Tseng (foley mixer)	HBO
2019 (27th)	Veep	"Veep"	William F. MacPherson (production mixer); John W. Cook II, William Freesh (re-recording mixers); Scott Sheppard (scoring mixer); Jesse Dodd (adr mixer); Mike Marino (foley mixer)	HBO

=== 2020s ===
Year	Program	Episode(s)	Nominees	Network
2020 (28th)	The Mandalorian	"Chapter 2: The Child"	Shawn Holden (production mixer); Stephen Urata, Bonnie Wild (re-recording mixers); Christopher Fogel (scoring mixer); Matthew Wood (adr mixer); Blake Collins (foley mixer)	Disney+
2020 (28th)	Dead to Me	"You Know What You Did"	Steven Michael Morantz (production mixer); Alexander Gruzdev, Brad Sherman (re-recording mixers); Jason Oliver (adr mixer)	Netflix
2020 (28th)	The Mandalorian	"Chapter 13: The Jedi"	Shawn Holden (production mixer); Stephen Urata, Bonnie Wild (re-recording mixers); Christopher Fogel (scoring mixer); Matthew Wood (adr mixer); Jason Butler (foley mixer)	Disney+
2020 (28th)	Modern Family	"Finale, Part 1"	Srdjan Popovic, Stephen Tibbo (production mixers); Peter Bawiec, Brian Harman, Dean Okrand (re-recording mixers); Matt Hovland (adr mixer); David Torres (foley mixer)	ABC
2020 (28th)	Ted Lasso	"The Hope That Kills You"	David Lascelles (production mixer); Sean Byrne, Ryan Kennedy (re-recording mixers); George Murphy (scoring mixer); Brent Findley, Marilyn Morris (adr mixers); Jordan McClain (foley mixer)	Apple TV+
2021 (29th)	Ted Lasso	"Rainbow"	David Lascelles (production mixer); Sean Byrne, Ryan Kennedy (re-recording mixers); George Murphy (scoring mixer); Brent Findley, Jamison Rabbe (adr mixers); Arno Stephanian (foley mixer)	Apple TV+
2021 (29th)	The Book of Boba Fett	"Chapter 1: Stranger in a Strange Land"	Shawn Holden (production mixer); Scott R. Lewis, Bonnie Wild (re-recording mixers); Alan Meyerson (scoring mixer); Richard Duarte (foley mixer)	Disney+
2021 (29th)	Cobra Kai	"December 19"	Michael Filosa (production mixer); Chris Carpenter, Joseph DeAngelis (re-recording mixers); Phil McGowan (scoring mixer); Marilyn Morris (adr mixer); Michael S. Head (foley mixer)	Netflix
2021 (29th)	Only Murders in the Building	"How Well Do You Know Your Neighbors?"	Joseph White Jr. (production mixer); Lindsay Alvarez, Mathew Waters (re-recording mixers); Alan DeMoss (scoring mixer); Stiv Schneider (adr mixer); Karina Rezhevska (foley mixer)	Hulu
2021 (29th)	What We Do in the Shadows	"The Casino"	Rob Beal (production mixer); Samuel Ejnes, Diego Gat (re-recording mixers); Mike Tehrani (adr mixer); Stacey Michaels (foley mixer)	FX
2022 (30th)	Only Murders in the Building	"The Tell"	Joseph White Jr. (production mixer); Penny Harold, Andrew Garrett Lange (re-recording mixers); Alan DeMoss (scoring mixer); Chris Navarro (adr mixer); Erika Koski (foley mixer)	Hulu
2022 (30th)	Barry	"starting now"	Scott Harber (production mixer); Elmo Ponsdomenech, Teddy Salas, Sean Heissinger (re-recording mixers); David Wingo (scoring mixer); Howard London (adr mixer); Darrin Mann (foley mixer)	HBO
2022 (30th)	The Bear	"Review"	Scott D. Smith (production mixer); Steve Giammaria (re-recording mixer); Patrick Christensen (adr mixer); Ryan Collison, Connor Nagy (foley mixers)	Hulu
2022 (30th)	She-Hulk: Attorney at Law	"Whose Show Is This?"	Marcus Petruska (production mixer); Pete Horner, Karol Urban (re-recording mixers); Alvin Wee (scoring mixer); Doc Kane (adr mixer); Jason Butler (foley mixer)	Disney+
2022 (30th)	What We Do in the Shadows	"Pine Barrens"	Rob Beal (production mixer); Sam Ejnes, Diego Gat, Marc Fishman (re-recording mixer); Stacey Michaels (foley mixer)	FX
2023 (31st)	Barry	"wow"	Scott Harber (production mixer); Elmo Ponsdomenech, Teddy Salas (re-recording mixers); David Wingo (scoring mixer); Aaron Hasson (adr mixer); Darrin Mann (foley mixer)	HBO
2023 (31st)	The Bear	"Forks"	Scott D. Smith (production mixer), Steve Giammaria (re-recording mixer), Patrick Christensen (adr mixer), Ryan Collison (foley mixer)	FX
2023 (31st)	The Mandalorian	"Chapter 24: The Return"	Shawn Holden (production mixer); Scott R. Lewis, Tony Villaflor (re-recording mixers); Chris Fogel (scoring mixer); Aaron Hasson (adr mixer); Scott Curtis (foley mixer)	Disney+
2023 (31st)	Only Murders in the Building	"Sitzprobe"	Joseph White Jr. (production mixer); Mathew Waters, Lindsey Alvarez (re-recording mixers); Derik Lee (song mixer); Alan DeMoss (scoring mixer); Derek Pacuk (ProTools playback mixer); Chris Navarro (adr mixer); Erika Koski (foley mixer)	Hulu
2023 (31st)	What We Do in the Shadows	"Local News"	Rob Beal (production mixer); Sam Ejnes, Diego Gat (re-recording mixer); Stacey Michaels (foley mixer)	FX

== Programs with multiple awards ==
5 awards

- Modern Family (ABC)

3 awards

- Deadwood (HBO)

2 awards

- 24 (Fox)
- Boardwalk Empire (HBO)
- NYPD Blue (ABC)
- The West Wing (NBC)

== Programs with multiple nominations ==
9 nominations

- 24 (Fox)
- Modern Family (ABC)

8 nominations

- NYPD Blue (ABC)

6 nominations

- CSI: Crime Scene Investigation (CBS)
- The Sopranos (HBO)

5 nominations

- ER (NBC)
- The X-Files (Fox)

4 nominations

- Barry (HBO)
- Nurse Jackie (Showtime)
- Silicon Valley (HBO)
- Veep (HBO)
- The West Wing (NBC)

3 nominations

- Alias (ABC)
- Chicago Hope (CBS)
- Deadwood (HBO)
- Dexter (Showtime)
- Lost (ABC)
- The Mandalorian (Disney+)
- Only Murders in the Building (Hulu)
- Parks and Recreation (NBC)
- Six Feet Under (HBO)
- Star Trek: Voyager (UPN)
- Ted Lasso (Apple TV+)
- What We Do in the Shadows (FX)

2 nominations

- Ballers (HBO)
- The Bear (FX/Hulu)
- Black-ish (ABC)
- Boardwalk Empire (HBO)
- Californication (Showtime)
- Glee (Fox)
- Law & Order (NBC)
- Mad Men (AMC)
- Lois & Clark: The New Adventures of Superman (ABC)
- The Office (NBC)
- Star Trek: The Next Generation (Syndicated)

== See also ==
- Primetime Emmy Award for Outstanding Sound Mixing for a Comedy or Drama Series (Half-Hour) and Animation
