= Suddenly Last Summer (disambiguation) =

Suddenly Last Summer is a play written by Tennessee Williams, which premiered in 1958.

Suddenly Last Summer may also refer to:

- Suddenly, Last Summer (film), a 1959 film by Joseph L. Mankiewicz based on the play
- "Suddenly Last Summer" (song), a 1983 song by The Motels
- Suddenly, Last Summer, a 1993 teleplay adaptation starring Maggie Smith, for the PBS anthology series Great Performances
- "Suddenly, Last Summer" (Modern Family), a 2013 episode of the American sitcom Modern Family
- Suddenly Last Summer, a 2009 album by Jimmy Somerville
- Suddenly Last Summer, a 2026 opera by Courtney Bryan adapted from the play
