= First Days (Modern Family) =

- Modern Family episode
- Episode no.: Season 5 Episode 2
- Directed by: Steven Levitan
- Written by: Paul Corrigan; Brad Walsh
- Production code: 5ARG02
- Original air date: September 25, 2013

Guest appearances
- Justin Kirk as Charlie Bingham; Andrew Daly as Principal Brown; J. P. Manoux as Todd; David Haydn-Jones as Director; Mitchell Edmonds as Albert; Nicholas Hormann as Roy

Episode chronology
← Previous "Suddenly, Last Summer"	Next → "Larry's Wife"
- Modern Family season 5

"First Days" is the second episode of the fifth season of the American sitcom Modern Family, and the series' 98th overall. It was aired on September 25, 2013, the same day as the premiere episode, Suddenly, Last Summer. The episode involves each character dealing with the difficulties of beginning new challenges. As the kids start school again, the parents find challenges in juggling schedules, beginning intimidating new jobs and coping with children growing older and less dependent.

The episode was written by Paul Corrigan & Brad Walsh and directed by series co-creator Steven Levitan.

== Plot ==
Luke (Nolan Gould) and Manny (Rico Rodriguez) have their first day at high school. The two of them take this change really well, something that is not happening with Phil (Ty Burrell) and Gloria (Sofía Vergara) because they realize that the boys are growing up very fast and they are going to lose them.

Claire (Julie Bowen) starts working at Jay's (Ed O'Neill) closet company making her big return. On her first day, she tries to get close to her co-workers and to convince them to not look at her as "Pritchett's daughter" but as Claire.

Cam (Eric Stonestreet) starts a new substituting gig at the high school where Alex (Ariel Winter) is attending and the lesson he has to teach is History. The only problem is that Cam does not know anything about the subject and Alex is the one who ends up teaching the other kids. Cam realizes that he can not teach History and he quits. However, as he is quitting, Cam incidentally reveals his keen coaching prowess and is immediately re-hired as a gym teacher and coach of the football team.

Mitch (Jesse Tyler Ferguson), with Cam going to his new job, tries to juggle Lily's (Aubrey Anderson-Emmons) first day of preschool and a very important meeting at work. Lily has a little accident, so Mitch takes her with him at the office and calls Haley (Sarah Hyland) to come and babysit her. When Haley arrives at Mitch's office, his boss (Justin Kirk) hits on her, making Mitch very uncomfortable.

== Reception ==
=== Ratings ===
In its original American broadcast, "First Days" (that was aired along with the premiere episode, Suddenly, Last Summer) was watched by 11.68 million.

=== Reviews ===
"First Days" received generally positive reviews.

Joe Reid of The A.V. Club gave a 'B+' grade to the episode (along with the Suddenly, Last Summer one) saying: " "First Days" is less [than Suddenly, Last Summer] heartwarming, by design, but it pairs up the characters interestingly enough that it works."

Leigh Raines of TV Fanatic rated the two episodes with a 5/5 saying that both of the show's episodes were strong. "I laughed out loud a few times, got a little misty eyed at moments and did a combination of the two when Jay started crying at Manny's letter and wanted to mail him his second robe. Only the best shows can bring out that kind of dual reaction!"

Matt LeMaire from The MacGuffin net rated both episodes with 8/10. "All in all, it’s a good episode that’s a bit too predictable given our knowledge of these characters, but it still provides some good laughs." It closes the review with: "As a premiere, both episodes did a good job of bringing us back into the world of Modern Family and while there were certainly some predictable elements, it’s our love of these characters that shines through as they navigate through their daily lives."

Emily Carlstrom from Better With Popcorn rated both episodes with 7.5/10. "This [Cameron's plot] is another thing the show does well. It subtly undermines stereotypes: Cam being the more theatrical of the gay couple is also a tough country boy and former football player."
