= And One to Grow On =

- Modern Family episode
- Episode no.: Season 5 Episode 11
- Directed by: Gail Mancuso
- Written by: Jeffrey Richman
- Production code: 5ARG12
- Original air date: January 8, 2014

Guest appearances
- Adam DeVine as Andy Bailey; Ariela Barer as Sophie; Alisha Boe as Tracy McCoy

Episode chronology
← Previous "The Old Man & the Tree"	Next → "Under Pressure"
- Modern Family season 5

"And One to Grow On" is the eleventh episode of the fifth season of the American sitcom Modern Family, and the series' 107th overall. It was aired on January 8, 2014. The episode was written by Jeffrey Richman and directed by Gail Mancuso.

== Plot ==
Phil (Ty Burrell) tricks Luke (Nolan Gould) into taking some ballroom dance lessons by lying to him that they will go to an "autopsy camp". Luke is very unhappy after his first lesson and is angry at Phil. On their way back home, they are pulled over by an officer for what seems to be just a license and registration check. However, Phil ends up in jail thanks to a pile of unpaid parking tickets from Haley (Sarah Hyland). Phil calls Claire (Julie Bowen) to ask her to come and bail him out, but Claire cannot remember Phil's complex mnemonic codes of where the money is. She searches all over the house and when she finally finds it after a couple of hours, she heads to the jail to bail Phil out.

In the meantime, Alex's (Ariel Winter) test for her driving license is soon and because Claire can not stand being with Alex in the car while she is driving, she is secretly paying Haley to drive with her for her lessons. Alex does not know about it until Claire calls Haley to tell her that her father is in jail because of her unpaid parking tickets. Alex starts giving her a lesson about how to park and Haley, to make her stop, tells her that their mom pays her to drive with her.

Meanwhile, Mitch (Jesse Tyler Ferguson) and Cam (Eric Stonestreet) continue their wedding plans and try to find a venue for the upcoming event. They find the perfect place that Cam always wanted, but Mitch is hesitant to book it due to the cost. In the few minutes they take to decide, the place is booked for the date they wanted by one of Cam's students for her Sweet 16 party.

Mitch and Cam are not willing to pick another date so Cam comes up with a plan. He knows that his student was going to have the party with her best friend someplace else, but the two girls Tracy (Alisha Boe) and Sophie (Ariela Barer) get into a fight; his plan is to get them to make up so they will have the party together as they originally planned and give up the location he and Mitch want. Both of them manage to get the two girls back together, but the final result is not what they hoped.

At the Pritchett house, Jay (Ed O'Neill) and Gloria (Sofía Vergara) plan a birthday party for Joe's first birthday while Manny (Rico Rodriguez) fusses over a girl named Amy, who left her coat over at their house during his own birthday party the previous night. Jay believes that Amy is out of Manny's league and he convinces Gloria to talk to Manny about another girl who has a crush on him but he is not noticing her. Gloria tries to talk to Manny but when she sees what he prepares for Amy, she changes her mind.

At the end of the episode, the whole family gathers for Joe's birthday party. Phil and Claire are mad at Haley for not paying her parking tickets while Alex and Luke are mad at them each for their own reasons; Alex because Claire does not want to drive with her and Luke because Phil took him to dance lessons. Haley manages to calm Alex and Luke down so they will not be mad at their parents by telling them the "real reasons" of why they did what they did and she seems to escape her punishment for not paying her tickets.

Cam and Mitch argue about how they missed the date they wanted to book for their wedding and Cam accuses Mitch that if he was not hesitant they would get the date they wanted. The argument leads Gloria and Claire to admit that it took them some time until they came around to Jay and Phil, but they did eventually. The same goes with Joe who Jay was trying to make him say daddy all day and he finally said "Jay". The whole discussion makes Jay accept the fact that Manny tries to be with a girl that is out of his league and he wishes him good luck since she might also come around eventually.

== Reception ==
=== Ratings ===
In its original American broadcast, "And One to Grow On" was watched by 9.51 million; down 1.10 from the previous episode.

=== Reviews ===
"And One to Grow On" received mixed reviews.

Leigh Raines of TV Fanatic gave the episode 4.5/5 naming Haley the MVP of the episode: "She is by no means a smart girl, but dammit if she doesn't pull off some of the best stunts on this show. People underestimate her. Look at her tonight, she managed to take the heat off of her parents when Alex and Luke were flipping out. She did it all on the spot too!" and also praising the scenes of Phil and Luke together: "Phil and Luke are comedic gold together. Their entire interaction in the car was amazing."

Britt Hayes of Screen Crush gave a good review to the episode saying: "This week’s episode isn’t so much about getting people or things to be the way you want them as it is about being patient with those you love. And it doesn’t hurt that it brought a few laughs along with it."

Joshua Alston of The A.V. Club gave a C rating to the episode, remarking that the episode was weird but "not weird in a good way, not interesting or daring or ambitious, just kind of generally lumpy, arrhythmic and not-quite-right." But he, like Raines, praised the scene of Luke and Phil: "There were some funny moments sprinkled around the episode. In particular, I liked Phil and Luke’s car scene prior to Phil’s arrest. Nolan Gould’s performance has started to grate on me as Luke has transitioned from a daffy, snarky kid to a yelpy young adult, but he and Ty Burrell really sold the scene, especially Phil’s wounded reactions to Luke’s mockery of Footloose."

Madina Papadopoulos from Paste Magazine gave the episode only 4.6/10 saying that the show left 2013 with a bang and begun 2014 with a bust and that the plot and jokes felt a little scattered and forced. "This episode was unfortunately underwhelming—something reflected by its title, “And One to Grow On,” reflects this week's quality."
