= Stephen Tibbo =

American sound mixer

- Born: Stephen A. Tibbo; 1968 (age 56–57)
- Occupation: Sound mixer
- Children: 2

Stephen A. Tibbo (born 1968) is a sound mixer who has worked in American Pie 2, Kiss Kiss Bang Bang, in addition to television shows including Modern Family, Ghost Whisperer, and Life. In addition, Tibbo did webisodes for the show Childrens Hospital, which won an Emmy". Since the early 1990s, Stephen Tibbo has "worked in both production and post production" and in "2007 Stephen built his own stage to do ADR and to mix film and television projects".

== Life and career ==
Stephen Tibbo, a native to California, is married and has two daughters. Earlier in his life, Tibbo enjoyed playing golf, but when he started attending university, sound became his hobby. In 1987, Tibbo started "in audio for film and television", serving as a boom operator, quickly working his way up to mixing. In 1989, Stephen Tibbo "mixed his first film and was hooked".

Tibbo's main recorder is a Zaxcom Deva. The sound mixer stated that for shows with a plethora of spontaneity, such as Modern Family, using the MKH 8060 Sennheiser microphone is ideal, because it "is not only compact and lightweight, but it was designed to suppress off-axis sounds without coloration, making it ideal for boom camera mounting." Half of the year, Stephen Tibbo does post-production sound work, out of the studio at his residence.

== Awards ==
- Nominated to Cinema Audio Society Award for Outstanding Achievement in Sound Mixing for Television Series– Modern Family, "Chirp" (2011)
- Primetime Emmy Award for Outstanding Sound Mixing for a Comedy or Drama Series (Half-Hour) and Animation – Modern Family, "En Garde" (2010)
- Nominated to Primetime Emmy Award for Outstanding Sound Mixing for a Comedy or Drama Series (Half-Hour) and Animation – Modern Family, "Halloween" (2011)
- Primetime Emmy Award for Outstanding Sound Mixing for a Comedy or Drama Series (Half-Hour) and Animation – Modern Family, "Dude Ranch" (2012)
- Nominated to Primetime Emmy Award for Outstanding Sound Mixing for a Comedy or Drama Series (Half-Hour) and Animation – Modern Family, "My Hero" (2013)
- Cinema Audio Society Award for Outstanding Achievement in Sound Mixing for Television Series - Half Hour – Modern Family, "Disneyland" (2013)
- Nominated to Primetime Emmy Award for Outstanding Sound Mixing for a Comedy or Drama Series (Half-Hour) and Animation – Modern Family, "The Wedding: Part 1" (2014)
- Cinema Audio Society Award for Outstanding Achievement in Sound Mixing for Television Series - Half Hour – Modern Family, "Goodnight Gracie" (2014)
- Cinema Audio Society Award for Outstanding Achievement in Sound Mixing for Television Series - Half Hour – Modern Family, "Australia" (2015)
- Primetime Emmy Award for Outstanding Sound Mixing for a Comedy or Drama Series (Half-Hour) and Animation – Modern Family, "Connection Lost" (2015)
- Cinema Audio Society Award for Outstanding Achievement in Sound Mixing for Television Series - Half Hour – Modern Family, "Connection Lost" (2016)
- Nominated to Primetime Emmy Award for Outstanding Sound Mixing for a Comedy or Drama Series (Half-Hour) and Animation – Modern Family, "The Storm" (2016)
- Cinema Audio Society Award for Outstanding Achievement in Sound Mixing for Television Series - Half Hour – Modern Family, "The Storm" (2017)
- Nominated to Primetime Emmy Award for Outstanding Sound Mixing for a Comedy or Drama Series (Half-Hour) and Animation – Modern Family, "Basketball" (2017)
- Nominated to Cinema Audio Society Award for Outstanding Achievement in Sound Mixing for Television Series– Modern Family, "Lake Life" (2018)
- Nominated to Primetime Emmy Award for Outstanding Sound Mixing for a Comedy or Drama Series (Half-Hour) and Animation – Modern Family, "Lake Life" (2018)
- Nominated to Cinema Audio Society Award for Outstanding Achievement in Sound Mixing for Television Series– Modern Family, "Did the Chicken Cross the Road?" (2019)
- Nominated to Primetime Emmy Award for Outstanding Sound Mixing for a Comedy or Drama Series (Half-Hour) and Animation – Modern Family, "A Year of Birthdays" (2019)
- Nominated to Cinema Audio Society Award for Outstanding Achievement in Sound Mixing for Television Series– Modern Family, "A Year of Birthdays" (2020)
- Nominated to Primetime Emmy Award for Outstanding Sound Mixing for a Comedy or Drama Series (Half-Hour) and Animation – Modern Family, "Finale, Part 1" (2020)
- Nominated to Cinema Audio Society Award for Outstanding Achievement in Sound Mixing for Television Series– Modern Family, "Finale, Part 1" (2021)
