= Suddenly, Last Summer (Modern Family) =

- Modern Family episode
- Episode no.: Season 5 Episode 1
- Directed by: James Bagdonas
- Written by: Jeffrey Richman
- Production code: 5ARG01
- Original air date: September 25, 2013

Episode chronology
← Previous "Goodnight Gracie"	Next → "First Days"
- Modern Family season 5

"Suddenly, Last Summer" is the first episode of the fifth season of the American sitcom Modern Family, and the series' 97th overall. It was aired on September 25, 2013. The episode was written by Jeffrey Richman and it was directed by James Bagdonas. Cam and Mitchell secretly set up a thrilling marriage proposal, while Gloria is saddened because of Manny going to Colombia. Claire and Phil attempt to send off the kids on a vacation to get some alone time.

== Plot ==
Gay marriage in California is now legal, and Cam (Eric Stonestreet) and Mitch (Jesse Tyler Ferguson) are excited because now they can get married. They both start planning for a proposal: Cam asks Gloria (Sofía Vergara) for her help, and Mitch asks Claire (Julie Bowen) for her help. Mitch, wanting to prove his romance, pretends to be sick and makes Cam drive him home. On their way home, though, they have a flat tire. As both of them kneel down to fix it, they both agree to marry each other, without actually asking the question, nor having a ring.

In the meantime, Claire and Phil (Ty Burrell) try to organize a kid-free week so they can be alone by coordinating Luke's (Nolan Gould) summer camp with Alex's (Ariel Winter) volunteering excursion and Haley's (Sarah Hyland) beach trip.

At the Delgado-Pritchett house, Manny (Rico Rodriguez) gets ready for his first solo trip to Colombia to see Gloria's family. Jay (Ed O'Neill) tries to get him ready as fast as possible before he changes his mind, because Jay would have her family come to visit them when Manny doesn't go.

== Reception ==
=== Ratings ===
In its original American broadcast, "Suddenly, Last Summer" (that was aired along with the second episode of season five, First Days) was watched by 11.68 million. It was the least watched premiere out of all seasons; the Pilot was watched by 12.61 million, The Old Wagon was watched by 12.61 million, Dude Ranch was watched by 14.54 million and Bringing Up Baby was watched by 14.44 million. However, it was up by 1.67 million from the last episode, Goodnight Gracie of season four.

=== Reviews ===
"Suddenly, Last Summer" received generally positive reviews, with the critics being positive with Mitchell and Cameron's plot and the idea of the two characters getting married.

Joe Reid of The A.V. Club gave a 'B+' grade to the episode (along with First Days one) saying: ""Suddenly, Last Summer" is the classic Summer Vacation Episode that can either happen at the beginning or end of a season and kind of exists somewhere out of time."

Leigh Raines of TV Fanatic rated the two episodes with a 5/5 saying that both of the show's episodes were strong. "I laughed out loud a few times, got a little misty eyed at moments and did a combination of the two when Jay started crying at Manny's letter and wanted to mail him his second robe. Only the best shows can bring out that kind of dual reaction!"

Madina Papadopoulos from Paste Magazine rated the episode with 8.1/10 saying that the season is off to a great start. "The characters came off strong, the jokes hit, and there were tear-jerking moments at the end. [...] As usual, the characters are incredible, the writing is impeccable, and there is a sweetness to the show which elevates it above just a sitcom."

Matt LeMaire from The MacGuffin net rated both episodes with 8/10. "...that moment when they both knelt down to change the tire and both said yes was quite sweet and heartfelt–ultimately perfect for these characters. Truthfully, that scene couldn’t have been written better." It closes the review with: "As a premiere, both episodes did a good job of bringing us back into the world of Modern Family and while there were certainly some predictable elements, it’s our love of these characters that shines through as they navigate through their daily lives."

Emily Carlstrom from Better With Popcorn rated both episodes with 7.5/10. "...my favourite part of the episode was Clare’s ‘ghoulish’ scenarios for Mitch to use when proposing to Cam after the Supreme Court legalized gay marriage. Including Cam and Mitch's reactions to this historic win was really important in grounding the current political climate in the real [realistic] lives of individuals."

== Production ==
The premiere of this season of the series began with new opening credits, which Nolan Gould stated had been done because everyone had grown up so much. In the scene where Jay and Manny go to the court house to get Manny's birth certificate, the people who are standing outside the court house are crew members of the show, including the cast director of the show, Jeff Greenberg, and his partner Lars.
