= Under Pressure (Modern Family) =

- Modern Family episode
- Episode no.: Season 5 Episode 12
- Directed by: James Bagdonas
- Written by: Elaine Ko
- Production code: 5ARG11
- Original air date: January 15, 2014

Guest appearances
- Jesse Eisenberg as Asher; Jane Krakowski as Dr. Donna Duncan; John Benjamin Hickey as Dr. Clark; Andrew Daly as Principal Brown; Anjali Bhimani as Nina Patel; James Gleason as Mr. Ingram

Episode chronology
← Previous "And One to Grow On"	Next → "Three Dinners"
- Modern Family season 5

"Under Pressure" is the twelfth episode of the fifth season of the American sitcom Modern Family, and the series' 108th overall. It was aired on January 15, 2014. The episode was written by Elaine Ko and directed by James Bagdonas.

In the episode, Alex suffers a meltdown during her birthday party due to the pressure she is always under and she finds herself a therapist. At the school's open day, Jay and Phil have fun taking Luke and Manny's lessons while Claire finally realizes how much pressure Alex must feel every day. Luke and Manny go out on a double date. While gym coach Cameron presents to a group of parents, Gloria fights with another mother and the three of them, including Cameron, end up at the principal's office. Mitchell and Lily meet their new neighbor Asher who is an environmentalist and passionate about ecology.

"Under Pressure" received positive reviews from the critics.

== Plot ==
Alex (Ariel Winter) suffers a stress-related meltdown on her sixteenth birthday and books an appointment with a therapist (John Benjamin Hickey). During her session, she explains that several years ago, she participated at a spelling bee contest and she wanted desperately to win even though she knew that there was no prize or money involved. She feels bad about always wanting to be the best and feels under pressure since she has the impression that no one in her family understands her.

Meanwhile, it is open house at the high school and Claire (Julie Bowen) takes Alex's advanced classes while Phil (Ty Burrell) takes Luke's (Nolan Gould). Claire finds that Alex's class is highly competitive with several hours of homework assigned every day. She admits that while she has always helped Haley (Sarah Hyland) and Luke, it's because they are not as self-reliant or as driven to succeed as Alex is, so Claire has neglected to consider the pressures she faces. She later meets Alex after her therapy session, who responds gratefully when Claire demonstrates her newfound understanding of her life.

Phil and Jay (Ed O'Neill) attend a lesson of Luke and Manny's (Rico Rodriguez), but Jay decides to have fun with Phil by giving him a flask and then pretending that it belongs to Phil. They eventually bond when Jay convinces Phil to "skip class" and go to the teacher's lounge to watch a football game on TV. When Jay tells Phil that is so cool that he could fix the TV, Phil wants to impress Jay even more and they move to the gymnasium where they can watch the game on the big screen using the school's projector. However, their match abruptly ends when the projector breaks and they both end up at the principal's office.

At the same time, Cam (Eric Stonestreet) prepares his presentation to the parents as the gym coach. He suggests a dodgeball match but the principal forbids him to do it. Despite that, seeing that everyone is bored and wants to leave his class, he allows the parents to play dodgeball after all. During the game, Gloria (Sofia Vergara) and Dr. Donna Duncan (Jane Krakowski) butt heads with one another over each of their boys getting the single spot in the junior congress. When they are the only ones left, Donna seizes the opportunity to attack Gloria. Subsequently, Donna admits that her behavior is a result of her divorce since she feels her son still blames her and has an admiration for his father despite the fact that he is never around. Gloria assures her that she was in the same situation and that her son will eventually figure out who the caring parent is.

As their parents are busy during the day, Manny and Luke have a double date with twin girls but during the date it turns out that Manny's girl has a lot in common with Luke and Luke's has a lot in common with Manny. However, when the boys suggest to exchange their girls, Manny's date reveals that she likes Latino guys and Luke's date says that she loves dumb boys, which offends both of them. As they get up to leave, the girls suggest to them to go at their home and make out since their parents are not there.

Mitchell (Jesse Tyler Ferguson) and Lily (Aubrey Anderson-Emmons) meet their neighbor Asher (Jesse Eisenberg), an environmentalist who also has a passion for ecology. Mitch is offended when Asher claims that he is not as environmentally friendly as he is. While Mitch and Haley are trying to get her old dollhouse out of her car for Lily, the styrofoam peanuts blow into Asher's yard. Asher gets back home and Mitch apologizes to him while Asher admits that he does not have any friends because of his eco-friendly ways. Mitch suggests that Asher have dinner with them, but Lily objects when he asks her if her dollhouse was built with sustainable materials.

== Reception ==
=== Ratings ===
In its original American broadcast, "Under Pressure" was watched by 9.14 million; down 0.37 from the previous episode.

=== Reviews ===
The episode received positive reviews.

Leigh Raines of TV Fanatic rated the episode with 4/5 criticizing though Eisenberg's character: "I just wish Jesse Eisenberg had played against type. I feel like he gets pegged as kind of a douchey, know-it-all. The character of Asher wasn't doing his typecasting any favors. I loved watching Mitchell, Haley and even Lily's one-liners, but that's about it. I wish he had done something funnier."

Joshua Alston from The A.V. Club gave the episode a B rating saying that the episode was a surprise. "It’s not one of the show’s funniest episodes by a long shot, and is about on par with the rest of the season in that regard. But it had some beats that made me smile, and an atypically emotional Alex story that elevated it and lent it some grit. I’m not sure it’s a trick Modern Family could pull off every week without redefining the essence of the show, but as a one-off, “Under Pressure” was livelier than it had any right to be."

Britt Hayes gave a good review to the episode saying though that she is torn about it: "On the one hand, I expected more comedy from an episode that touts guest stars like Jesse Eisenberg and Jane Krakowski. [...] On the other hand, Alex’s story is so wonderful and poignant, and her conclusion with Claire is so moving that any other flaws in the episode seem hardly worth the complaint."
