= Three Dinners =

- Modern Family episode
- Episode no.: Season 5 Episode 13
- Directed by: Steven Levitan
- Written by: Abraham Higginbotham; Steven Levitan; Jeffrey Richman
- Production code: 5ARG15
- Original air date: January 22, 2014

Guest appearances
- Chazz Palminteri as Shorty; Jennifer Tilly as Darlene; Eddie McClintock as Brandon; Leslie Grossman as Katie; Tony Cavalero as Brian

Episode chronology
← Previous "Under Pressure"	Next → "iSpy"
- Modern Family season 5

"Three Dinners" is the thirteenth episode of the fifth season of the American sitcom Modern Family, and the series' 109th overall. It was aired on January 22, 2014. The episode was written by Abraham Higginbotham, Steven Levitan & Jeffrey Richman and directed by Steven Levitan.

In the episode, Jay's friend Shorty and his wife arrive at the Pritchett house for a dinner where Shorty informs Jay and Gloria that he and his wife decided to move to Costa Rica, leading the two friends to argue. Mitchell and Cameron go out on a romantic dinner to distract themselves from the planning of their upcoming wedding. Phil and Claire go out for a dinner with Haley to discuss her future.

"Three Dinners" received positive reviews from the critics.

Ariel Winter and Nolan Gould do not appear in this episode.

== Plot ==
Jay (Ed O'Neill) and Gloria (Sofia Vergara) host Shorty (Chazz Palminteri) and his wife, Darlene (Jennifer Tilly), for a dinner at their house. During the dinner, Shorty tells Jay and Gloria that they are moving to Costa Rica in a couple of weeks. Jay gets upset with the news and he does not know how to react. He tries everything to make Shorty change his mind but the two of them end up fighting with Shorty leaving the house. Gloria tries to make Jay admit that the reason he reacted that way is because he is afraid that Shorty will like Costa Rica and he will not come back. Even though Jay denies it, he later accepts the possibility of "losing" his best friend and gets very emotional when he tells him goodbye.

Mitchell (Jesse Tyler Ferguson) and Cam (Eric Stonestreet), due to the stressful days they have gone through in the last couple of months with the wedding planning, decide to go on a romantic date at a restaurant to reduce the tension between them. With the subject of the wedding and Lily (Aubrey Anderson-Emmons) off the table, they do not have much to say. Things get more interesting when they start talking to the couple who is sitting next to them, Brandon (Eddie McClintock) and Katie (Leslie Grossman), and Brandon reveals to them that he wants to propose to Katie. Katie rejects Brandon and after further discussions with the unwitting Mitchell and Cam, is further convinced she does not want to get married. Mitchell and Cam reaffirm their love in spite of the break up next to them.

Phil (Ty Burrell) and Claire (Julie Bowen) decide to take Haley (Sarah Hyland) out for a dinner so they can discuss her future. They worry that she does not know or have any plans about her future, and they decide that it is time to get her to make plans. Haley deduces their intentions and why they asked her out and reveals that she has already become a semi-successful photo blogger. Things then get reversed when she asks them what are their plans for the future when all three of them (Alex (Ariel Winter), Luke (Nolan Gould), and herself) leave the house.

== Reception ==
=== Ratings ===
In its original American broadcast, "Three Dinners" was watched by 9.59 million; up 0.45 from the previous episode.

=== Reviews ===
Joshua Alston of The A.V. Club gave the episode a B+ rate saying: "...it’s a solid episode that does nothing to push against the show’s boundaries, but it was brisk and had some solid laughs. [...] In the first three seasons, “Three Dinners” would have been an average episode, but in season five, it’s pretty sterling."

Leigh Raines from TV Fanatic rated the episode with 5/5 saying that the show "gave us one [dinner] that was surprising, one with difficult emotions and one that ended up really, really awkward."

Madina Papadopoulos from Paste Magazine rated the episode with 9.2/10 saying: ""Three Dinners" could have been a stage play, and it would have received a standing ovation. [...] this episode proved that sedentary table talk can make you fall out of your chair with laughter."
