= Cinema Audio Society Awards 2013 =

Film and television award show

50th CAS Awards

February 22, 2014

Motion Picture – Live Action:
Gravity
Motion Picture – Animated:
Frozen

The 50th Cinema Audio Society Awards were held on February 22, 2014, in the Bunker Hill Ballroom of the OMNI Los Angeles Hotel at California Plaza, Los Angeles, honoring outstanding achievements in sound mixing in film and television of 2013.

== Winners and nominees ==
Outstanding Achievement in Sound Mixing for a Motion Picture – Live Action	Outstanding Achievement in Sound Mixing for a Motion Picture – Animated
Gravity – Production Mixer: Chris Munro, CAS; Re-recording Mixer: Skip Lievsay, CAS; Re-recording Mixer: Niv Adiri; Re-recording Mixer: Christopher Benstead; Scoring Mixer: Gareth Cousins; ADR Mixer: Chris Navarro, CAS; ADR Mixer: Thomas J. O'Connell; Foley Mixer: Adam Mendez: Captain Phillips – Production Mixer: Chris Munro, CAS; Re-recording Mixer: Michael Prestwood Smith; Re-recording Mixer: Chris Burdon; Re-recording Mixer: Mark Taylor; Scoring Mixer: Al Clay; ADR Mixer: Howard London, CAS; Foley Mixer: Glen Gathard; Inside Llewyn Davis – Production Mixer: Peter F. Kurland, CAS; Re-recording Mixer: Skip Lievsay, CAS; Re-recording Mixer: Greg Orloff, CAS; ADR Mixer: Bobby Johanson, CAS; Foley Mixer: George A. Lara; Iron Man 3 – Production Mixer: Jose Antonio Garcia; Re-recording Mixer: Michael Prestwood Smith; Re-recording Mixer: Michael Keller, CAS; Scoring Mixer: Joel Iwataki; ADR Mixer: Gregory Steele, CAS; Foley Mixer: James Ashwill; Lone Survivor – Production Mixer: David Brownlow; Re-recording Mixer: Andrew Koyama, CAS; Re-recording Mixer: Beau Borders, CAS; Scoring Mixer: Satoshi Mark Noguchi; ADR Mixer:Gregory Steele, CAS; Foley Mixer: Nerses Gezalyan	Frozen – Original Dialogue Mixer: Gabriel Guy; Re-recording Mixer: David E. Fluhr, CAS; Re-recording Mixer: Gabriel Guy; Scoring Mixer: Casey Stone; Foley Mixer: Mary Jo Lang: The Croods – Original Dialogue Mixer: Tighe Sheldon; Re-recording Mixer: Randy Thom, CAS; Re-recording Mixer: Gary A. Rizzo, CAS; Scoring Mixer: Dennis S. Sands, CAS; Foley Mixer: Corey Tyler; Despicable Me 2 – Original Dialogue Mixer: Charleen Richards; Re-recording Mixer: Tom Johnson; Re-recording Mixer: Gary A. Rizzo, CAS; Re-recording Mixer: Christopher Scarabosio; Scoring Mixer: Alan Meyerson, CAS; Foley Mixer: Tony Eckert; Monsters University – Original Dialogue Mixer: Doc Kane; Re-recording Mixer: Michael Semanick, CAS; Re-recording Mixer: Gary Summers; Scoring Mixer: David Boucher; Foley Mixer: Corey Tyler; Walking with Dinosaurs – Original Dialogue Mixer: Chris Navarro, CAS; Re-recording Mixer: Andrew Koyama, CAS; Re-recording Mixer: Martyn Zub; Scoring Mixer: Rupert Coulson; Foley Mixer: Sam Rogers
Outstanding Achievement in Sound Mixing for a Television Movie or Mini-Series	Outstanding Achievement in Sound Mixing for Television Series – One Hour
Behind the Candelabra – Production Mixer: Dennis Towns; Re-recording Mixer: Larry Blake; Scoring Mixer: Thomas Vicari; Foley Mixer: Scott Curtis: American Horror Story: Coven – "The Replacements" – Production Mixer: Bruce Litecky, CAS; Re-recording Mixer: Joe Earle, CAS; Re-recording Mixer: Doug Andham, CAS; Scoring Mixer: James Levine; ADR Mixer: Judah Getz; Foley Mixer: Kyle Billingsley; Battlestar Galactica: Blood and Chrome – Production Mixer: Ric Bal, CAS; Re-recording Mixer: John W. Cook II, CAS; Re-recording Mixer: Peter J. Nusbaum, CAS; Bonnie and Clyde: (Night Two) Part Two – Production Mixer: Erik H. Magnus, CAS; Re-recording Mixer: R. Russell Smith; Re-recording Mixer: Robert Edmondson, CAS; Scoring Mixer: Shawn Murphy; ADR Mixer: David Weisberg; Foley Mixer: Jeff Gross; Phil Spector – Production Mixer: Gary Alper; Re-recording Mixer: Michael Barry, CAS; Re-recording Mixer: Roy Waldspurger; Scoring Mixer: Christopher Fogel, CAS; ADR Mixer: Michael Miller, CAS; Foley Mixer: Don White	Game of Thrones: The Rains of Castamere – Production Mixer: Ronan Hill, CAS; Re-recording Mixer: Onnalee Blank, CAS; Re-recording Mixer: Mathew Waters, CAS; Foley Mixer: Brett Voss: Boardwalk Empire: Erlkönig – Production Mixer: Franklin D. Stettner, CAS; Re-recording Mixer: Tom Fleischman, CAS; ADR Mixer: Mark DeSimone, CAS; Foley Mixer: George A. Lara; Breaking Bad: Felina – Production Mixer: Darryl L. Frank, CAS; Re-recording Mixer: Jeffrey Perkins; Re-recording Mixer: Eric Justen; ADR Mixer: Kathryn Madsen; Homeland: Good Night – Production Mixer: Larry Long; Re-recording Mixer: Nello Torri, CAS; Re-recording Mixer: Alan M. Decker, CAS; ADR Mixer: Paul Drenning, CAS; Foley Mixer: Shawn Kennelly; The Walking Dead: Home – Production Mixer: Michael P. Clark, CAS; Re-recording Mixer: Daniel J. Hiland, CAS; Re-recording Mixer: Gary D. Rogers, CAS; ADR Mixer: Greg Crawford
Outstanding Achievement in Sound Mixing for Television Series – Half Hour	Outstanding Achievement in Sound Mixing for Television Non Fiction, Variety or Music – Series or Specials
Modern Family: Goodnight Gracie – Production Mixer: Stephen A. Tibbo, CAS; Re-recording Mixer: Dean Okrand; Re-recording Mixer: Brian Harman, CAS: Californication: I'll Lay My Monsters Down – Production Mixer: Daniel Church; Re-recording Mixer: Todd Grace, CAS; Re-recording Mixer: Edward Charles Carr III, CAS; Nurse Jackie: Teachable Moments – Production Mixer: Jan McLaughlin, CAS; Re-recording Mixer: Peter Waggoner; The Office: Finale – Production Mixer: Benjamin A. Patrick, CAS; Re-recording Mixer: John W. Cook II, CAS; Re-recording Mixer: Robert Carr, CAS; Parks and Recreation: Leslie and Ben – Production Mixer: Steven Michael Morantz, CAS; Re-recording Mixer: John W. Cook II, CAS; Re-recording Mixer: Kenneth Kobett, CAS	History of the Eagles – Part One – Re-Recording Mixer: Tom Fleischman, CAS; Re-Recording Mixer: Elliot Scheiner: 2013 Rock and Roll Hall of Fame Induction Ceremony – Dialogue and Music Mixer: Michael Minkler, CAS; FX Mixer: Greg Townsend; Deadliest Catch – The Final Battle – Re-Recording Mixer: Bob Bronow, CAS; Killing Lincoln – Production Mixer: William Britt; Re-Recording Mixer: Stanley Kastner; Mike Tyson: Undisputed Truth – Production Mixer: Mathew Price, CAS; Re-Recording Mixer: Michael Barry, CAS

10th CAS Technical Achievement Awards

- Production: Sound Devices, LLC – 633 Mixer/Recorder
- Post-production: iZotope – RX 3 Advanced

CAS Honorary Awards

- Career Achievement Honors: Andy Nelson
- Filmmaker Award: Edward Zwick
