= William Nicholson (sound engineer) =

American sound re-recording mixer

William M. Nicholson (born November 18, 1937) is a sound re-recording mixer at NBC Universal studios in Los Angeles, California. During his lengthy career, he has received numerous awards and nominations, including 5 Emmy awards, 22 Emmy nominations, 2 Cinema Audio Society nominations, and an Academy Award nomination for Martin Scorsese's 1980 film Raging Bull. He is also a member of the Academy of Motion Picture Arts and Sciences.

== Biography ==
Nicholson was born in San Antonio, Texas and grew up in McLean County, Illinois. After serving in the Army in post-World War II Europe, he moved to Los Angeles and took a job as a rent boy, eventually working his way up to sound mixer. After working on feature films for Warner Hollywood Studios, he moved to Todd-AO/Glen Glenn in the early 1980s to do television post-production. In 1998, he began work on Dubbing stage 2 at Universal Studios. While there, aside from many other projects, he has mixed all but three of the shows in Dick Wolf's 18-year-old Law & Order franchise.

After moving away from full-length feature films to work in television, Nicholson's old job was taken by Kevin O'Connell, the person with the most Academy Award nominations (19) without a win.

He currently lives with his wife Barbara in Glendale, California.

== Awards and nominations ==
=== Oscars ===
- 1980 nomination, Best Sound, Raging Bull

=== Emmys ===
- 1982 Emmy nomination, Outstanding Individual Achievement - Children's Programming, Rascals and Robbers: The Secret Adventures of Tom Sawyer and Huck Finn (1982)
- 1982 Emmy award, Outstanding Film Sound Mixing for a Series, Hill Street Blues, for episode "Personal Foul"
- 1983 Emmy award, Outstanding Film Sound Mixing for a Series, Hill Street Blues, for episode "Trial By Fury"
- 1983 Emmy nomination, Outstanding Film Sound Mixing for a Series, Cagney & Lacey, for episode "Recreational Use"
- 1983 Emmy nomination, Outstanding Film Sound Mixing for a Series, St. Elsewhere, for episode "The Count"
- 1984 Emmy award, Outstanding Film Sound Mixing for a Series, Hill Street Blues, for episode "Parting is Such Sweep Sorrow"
- 1984 Emmy nomination, Outstanding Film Sound Mixing for a Series, Cagney & Lacey, for episode "Bounty Hunter"
- 1984 Emmy nomination, Outstanding Film Sound Mixing for a Series, Hill Street Blues, for episode "Praise Dilaudid"
- 1985 Emmy nomination, Outstanding Film Sound Mixing for a Series, St. Elsewhere, for episode "Sweet Dreams"
- 1985 Emmy nomination, Outstanding Film Sound Mixing for a Series, Hill Street Blues, for episode "Queen For a Day"
- 1985 Emmy nomination, Outstanding Film Sound Mixing for a Series, Hill Street Blues, for episode "The Rise and Fall of Paul the Wall"
- 1985 Emmy award, Outstanding Film Sound Mixing for a Series, Cagney & Lacey, for episode "Heat"
- 1986 Emmy nomination, Outstanding Sound Mixing for a Comedy Series or a Special, Newhart, for episode "Larry's Dead, Long Live Larry"
- 1986 Emmy award, Outstanding Sound Mixing for a Drama Series, St. Elsewhere, for episode "Iced Coffey"
- 1986 Emmy nomination, Outstanding Sound Mixing for a Drama Series, Hill Street Blues, for episode "Time Heals, part 2"
- 1987 Emmy nomination, Outstanding Sound Mixing for a Drama Series, Crime Story, for pilot episode
- 1987 Emmy nomination, Outstanding Sound Mixing for a Drama Series, Hill Street Blues, for episode "It Ain't Over Till it's Over"
- 1988 Emmy nomination, Outstanding Sound Mixing for a Dramatic Miniseries or a Special, Foxfire
- 1997 Emmy nomination, Outstanding Sound Mixing for a Drama Series, Law & Order, for episode "D-Girl"
- 1999 Emmy nomination, Outstanding Sound Mixing for a Drama Series, Law & Order, for episode "Empire"
- 2000 Emmy nomination, Outstanding Sound Mixing for a Drama Series, Law & Order, for episode "Gunshow"
- 2001 Emmy nomination, Outstanding Single Camera Sound Mixing for a Series, Law & Order, for episode "School Daze"
- 2001 Cinema Audio Society nomination, Outstanding Achievement in Sound Mixing for a Television Series, Law & Order, for episode "Standoff"
- 2002 Cinema Audio Society nomination, Outstanding Sound Mixing for Television - Series, Law & Order, for episode "Soldier of Fortune"

== List of films and television shows worked on ==
[incomplete listing]

=== Films ===
- Being There (1979)
- Smokey and the Bandit II (1980)
- The Island (1980)
- Xanadu (1980)
- Raging Bull (1980)
- Inside Moves (1980)
- The Cannonball Run (1981)
- Southern Comfort (1981)
- Sharky's Machine (1981)
- Death Valley (1982)
- Jetsons: The Movie (1990)
- A Guy Walks into a Bar (1997)

=== Television series ===
- Hill Street Blues
- St. Elsewhere
- Cagney & Lacey
- Remington Steele
- Bay City Blues
- Beverly Hills Cop
- Father Dowling Mysteries
- Jake and the Fatman
- Murder She Wrote
- Diagnosis Murder
- Miami Vice
- SeaQuest
- Nasty Boys
- New York Undercover
- Law & Order
- Law & Order: Special Victims Unit
- Law & Order: Criminal Intent
- Law & Order: Trial by Jury
- Law & Order: Crime & Punishment
- Conviction
- Lipstick Jungle

=== Television films ===
- Rascals & Robbers: The Secret Adventures of Tom Sawyer & Huck Finn (1982)
- The Lightship (1986)
- Perry Mason: The Case of the All-Star Assassin (1989)
- Perry Mason: The Case of the Poisoned Pen (1990)
- Perry Mason: The Case of the Desperate Deception (1990)
- Perry Mason: The Case of the Reckless Romeo (1992)
- Perry Mason: The Case of the Heartbroken Bride (1992)
- Ladykiller (1992)
- In the Company of Darkness (1993)
- Blindsided (1993)
- Perry Mason: The Case of the Skin-Deep Scandal (1993)
- For the Love of My Child: The Alissa Ayala Story (1993)
- Caught in the Act (1993)
- The Disappearance of Christina (1993)
- Children of the Mist (1993)
- Perry Mason: The Case of the Telltale Talk Show Host (1993)
- Perry Mason: The Case of the Killer Kiss (1993)
- The Haunting of Seacliff Inn (1994)
- A Perry Mason Mystery: The Case of the Lethal Lifestyle (1994)
- Perry Mason: The Case of the Skin-Deep Scandal (1994)
- Don't Talk to Strangers (1994)
- Out of Annie's Past (1995)
- A Perry Mason Mystery: The Case of the Jealous Jokester (1995)
- Evil Has a Face (1996)
- Exiled (1998)
- Haley Wagner, Star (1999)
- Horse Sense (1999)
