= Cinema Audio Society Awards 2010 =

Annual US film and television awards ceremony

47th CAS Awards

February 19, 2011

Theatrical Releases:
True Grit

The 47th Cinema Audio Society Awards, which were held on February 19, 2011, honored the outstanding achievements in sound mixing in film and television of 2010.

== Winners and nominees ==
=== Film ===
- True Grit — Peter F. Kurland, Skip Lievsay, Craig Berkey, and Greg Orloff
  - Black Swan — Ken Ishii, Dominick Tavella, and Craig Henighan
  - Inception — Ed Novick, Lora Hirschberg, and Gary Rizzo
  - Shutter Island — Petur Hliddal and Tom Fleishman
  - The Social Network — Mark Weingarten, Ren Klyce, David Parker, and Michael Semanick

=== Television ===
==== Series ====
- Boardwalk Empire (Episode: "A Return to Normalcy")
  - 24 (Episode: "3:00 p.m. – 4:00 p.m.")
  - Dexter (Episode: "Take It!")
  - Glee (Episode: "The Power of Madonna")
  - Modern Family (Episode: "Chirp")

==== Miniseries or Television Film ====
- Temple Grandin
  - The Pacific (Episode: "Basilone")
  - The Pacific (Episode: "Iwo Jima")
  - The Pacific (Episode: "Okinawa")
  - The Pacific (Episode: "Peleliu Landing")
