= Cinema Audio Society Awards 2015 =

US film and television awards ceremony

52nd CAS Awards

February 20, 2016

Motion Picture – Live Action:
The Revenant
Motion Picture – Animated:
Inside Out

The 52nd Cinema Audio Society Awards were held on February 20, 2016, in the Bunker Hill Ballroom of the OMNI Los Angeles Hotel at California Plaza, Los Angeles, honoring outstanding achievements in sound mixing in film and television of 2015.

== Winners and nominees ==
Outstanding Achievement in Sound Mixing for a Motion Picture – Live Action	Outstanding Achievement in Sound Mixing for a Motion Picture – Animated
The Revenant – Production Mixer: Chris Duesterdiek; Re-recording Mixer: Jon Taylor, CAS; Re-recording Mixer: Frank Montaño; Re-recording Mixer: Randy Thom, CAS; Scoring Mixer: Conrad Hensel; ADR Mixer: Michael Miller, CAS; Foley Mixer: Geordy Sincavage: Bridge of Spies – Production Mixer: Drew Kunin; Re-recording Mixer: Andy Nelson, CAS; Re-recording Mixer: Gary Roger Rydstrom, CAS; Scoring Mixer: Thomas Vicari, CAS; ADR Mixer: Bobby Johanson, CAS; Foley Mixer: Chris Manning; The Hateful Eight – Production Mixer: Mark Ulano, CAS; Re-recording Mixer: Michael Minkler, CAS; Re-recording Mixer: Chris Minkler; Scoring Mixer: Fabio Venturi; Foley Mixer: Nerses Gezalyan; Mad Max: Fury Road – Production Mixer: Ben Oslo; Re-recording Mixer: Chris Jenkins; Re-recording Mixer: Gregg Rudolf; ADR Mixer: Thomas J. O'Connell; Foley Mixer: Ryan Squires; Star Wars: The Force Awakens – Production Mixer: Stuart Wilson; Re-recording Mixer: Andy Nelson, CAS; Re-recording Mixer: Chris Scarabosio; Scoring Mixer: Shawn Murphy; ADR Mixer: Charleen Steeves; Foley Mixer: Chris Manning	Inside Out – Original Dialogue Mixer: Doc Kane; Re-recording Mixer: Tom Johnson; Re-recording Mixer: Michael Semanick; Scoring Mixer: Joel Iwataki; Foley Mixer: Mary Jo Lang, CAS: The Good Dinosaur – Original Dialogue Mixer: Vince Caro; Re-recording Mixer: Tom Johnson; Re-recording Mixer: Michael Semanick; Scoring Mixer: Brad Haehnel; Foley Mixer: Kyle Rochlin; Hotel Transylvania 2 – Original Dialogue Mixer: Howard London, CAS; Re-recording Mixer: Michael Semantic; Re-recording Mixer: Tom Johnson; Scoring Mixer: Brad Haehnel; Foley Mixer: Randy Singer, CAS; Minions – Original Dialogue Mixer: Carlos Sotolongo; Re-recording Mixer: Gary Rizzo, CAS; Re-recording Mixer: Chris Scarabosio; Scoring Mixer: Shawn Murphy; Foley Mixer: Corey Tyler; The Peanuts Movie – Original Dialogue Mixer: Bill Higley; Re-recording Mixer: Lora Hirschberg; Re-recording Mixer: Randy Thom, CAS; Re-recording Mixer: Leff Lefferts; Scoring Mixer: Casey Stone, CAS; Foley Mixer: Jason Butler

12th CAS Technical Achievement Award

- Production: Sound Devices, LLC – SL6
- Post-production: iZotope – RX5
