= Goodnight Gracie =

- Modern Family episode
- Episode no.: Season 4 Episode 24
- Directed by: Steven Levitan
- Written by: Steven Levitan; Jeffrey Richman
- Production code: 4ARG23
- Original air date: May 22, 2013

Guest appearances
- Fred Willard as Frank Dunphy; Millicent Martin as Charlotte; Anita Gillette as Annie Fitzsimmons; Ann Magnuson as Shelley; Caroline Aaron as Judge Bartley; Mary Jo Catlett as Edith; Peggy Miley as Hattie; Ruth Williamson as Marilyn

Episode chronology
← Previous "Games People Play"	Next → "Suddenly, Last Summer"
- Modern Family season 4

"Goodnight Gracie" is the 24th and final episode of the fourth season of the American sitcom Modern Family, and the series' 96th episode overall. It aired on May 22, 2013. It was written by Steven Levitan and Jeffrey Richman, and directed by Levitan.

== Plot ==
Phil's (Ty Burrell) mother passes away, and the whole family flies to Florida for the funeral.

When they get there, Jay (Ed O'Neill) runs into a woman who seems familiar to him, but he cannot put his finger on where he has met the woman before. While talking to her, he remembers that he lost his virginity to her when he was 18, but she has trouble remembering him. Jay tries unsuccessfully to make her remember him, since it is revealed that many boys also lost their virginity to her back then.

An arrest warrant is pending in Florida for Gloria (Sofia Vergara), because after moving and subletting her room in a house there, her roommate turned their apartment into a brothel. Mitchell (Jesse Tyler Ferguson) agrees to represent her in court, and at Gloria's urging, he ends up negotiating the acquittal of numerous other defendants to the increasing ire of the judge. When he finally comes to represent Gloria, the judge settles the case since she can not stand to hear him anymore. After his success at the court, Mitchell regains confidence in his ability as a criminal defense attorney and wants to return to the court.

Cam (Eric Stonestreet) meets a few residents of the retirement community, and when he sees that they have some common interests, he spends time with them, talking about books and playing Mahjong. The women are insatiable gossips, just like Cam, and the stories he overhears prove valuable later.

In the meantime, Phil's mother left gifts with attached notes for Phil and her grandkids, Haley (Sarah Hyland), Alex (Ariel Winter) and Luke (Nolan Gould). In Phil's letter, she writes about the last thing she would want him to do for her, which is to set up his father, Frank (Fred Willard), with Annie Fitzsimmons, a woman who is a neighbor of theirs, so he will not be alone. Phil does not like the idea at all, but Claire (Julie Bowen) says that he has to honor his mother's wish, especially since it is her last one. As they arrive at the woman's house, a man answers the door, and Claire is left stunned; she then pretends to be selling vacuum cleaners. Later, Cam shares his gossip with Phil and Claire, and it is revealed that the man who answered the door earlier was not the woman's boyfriend but in fact her brother. Consequently, Phil heads over to her house with the offer, but it is unknown whether the woman accepted it or not.

Haley's letter was accompanied by a necklace, Luke's by a pocket watch, and Alex's by a lighter with a note saying "this is a lighter." Alex, who was very close to her grandmother, is hurt by the seemingly shallow gift. Alex asks Frank about the note, and he notices it is in fact a letter which, in the humid environment in Florida, has become stuck together. In the letter, Gracie tells the story of how she got a hold of the lighter (by stealing it from her favorite actor, Paul Newman, who ate at the restaurant where she was then waitressing) and encourages Alex to "break the rules" sometimes (which she does by setting off fireworks during the funeral even though the memorial service guide specifically asked them to do otherwise).

== Reception ==
=== Ratings ===
In its original American broadcast, "Goodnight Gracie" was watched by 10.01 million; slightly down by 0.02 from the previous episode.

=== Reviews ===
"Goodnight Gracie" received critical acclaim.

Donna Bowman of The A.V. Club gave an A− grade to the episode saying that it was one of the best episodes of the entire run. "It was hip to rag on Modern Family when this season started, as is natural for anything so lauded and yet so conventional. Nothing’s changed as this season ends, and too frequently the show strains to fulfill its promise. But when it’s good, as this fleet, funny, and sweet finale shows, there are few comedies on television more satisfying."

Leigh Raines of TV Fanatic rated the episode with a 5/5 saying that it was perfectly balanced. "Humorous and heartwarming. Those are the two words I would use to describe the Modern Family season 4 finale. It was a perfect balance that proved once again why Modern Family has won all of those Emmys."

Dalene Rovenstine from Paste Magazine rated the episode with 9.4/10 stating that the season was not the best but it went out with one of the strongest episodes. "The season definitely wasn’t the best, but it’s going out until next fall on one of its strongest episodes. A death on a sitcom is hard to do, but with “Goodnight Gracie”, Modern Family achieved the perfect balance lighthearted comedy, touching human emotion and heartwarming family drama."

Zach Dionne from Vulture rated the episode with 4/5.

Michael Adams of 411mania rated the episode with 8.5/10 saying that it was an interesting season finale. "In my opinion, a season finale should have a cliff hanger moment, or at least something that will make you come back in September, and Mitchell wanting to quit his job is not it to me. But despite the lack of a cliff hanger, I thought this was a really well done episode. It was very funny, and touching at the same time. [...] When a sitcom writer can mix amazing humor and heartwarming moments together, that's the stamp of a great show."

Wyner C from Two Cents TV gave a good review to the episode saying that it was kind of bittersweet one. " I felt the emotion and the love – I laughed. What more can I ask for in an episode?"
