= Modern Family season 4 =

Modern Family
- Season 4
- DVD cover
- Starring: Ed O'Neill; Sofía Vergara; Julie Bowen; Ty Burrell; Jesse Tyler Ferguson; Eric Stonestreet; Sarah Hyland; Ariel Winter; Nolan Gould; Rico Rodriguez; Aubrey Anderson-Emmons
- No. of episodes: 24

Release
- Original network: ABC
- Original release: September 26, 2012 – May 22, 2013

Season chronology
- ← Previous; Season 3 Next → Season 5

The fourth season of the American television sitcom Modern Family aired on ABC from September 26, 2012 to May 22, 2013.

This season was ordered on May 10, 2012. The season was produced by Lloyd-Levitan Productions in association with 20th Century Fox Television, with series creators Steven Levitan and Christopher Lloyd serving as showrunners.

== Production ==
The fourth season of the show was produced by Lloyd-Levitan Productions in association with 20th Century Fox Television and airs on the American Broadcasting Company (ABC). Modern Family is produced by co-creators Christopher Lloyd and Steven Levitan who serve as executive producers and show runners with Bill Wrubel as co-executive producer.

=== Cast ===
- Ed O'Neill as Jay Pritchett
- Sofía Vergara as Gloria Pritchett
- Julie Bowen as Claire Dunphy
- Ty Burrell as Phil Dunphy
- Jesse Tyler Ferguson as Mitchell Pritchett
- Eric Stonestreet as Cameron Tucker
- Sarah Hyland as Haley Dunphy
- Ariel Winter as Alex Dunphy
- Nolan Gould as Luke Dunphy
- Rico Rodriguez as Manny Delgado
- Aubrey Anderson-Emmons as Lily Tucker-Pritchett

Modern Family employs an ensemble cast. The series is set in Los Angeles and focuses on the family lives of Jay Pritchett (Ed O'Neill), his daughter Claire Dunphy (Julie Bowen), and his son Mitchell Pritchett (Jesse Tyler Ferguson). Claire is a homemaker mom married to Phil Dunphy (Ty Burrell); they have three children, Haley (Sarah Hyland), the typical teenager, Alex (Ariel Winter), the smart middle child and Luke (Nolan Gould), the offbeat only son. Jay is married to a much younger Colombian woman, Gloria (Sofía Vergara), and is helping her raise her teen son, Manny (Rico Rodriguez). Mitchell and his partner Cameron Tucker (Eric Stonestreet) have adopted a Vietnamese baby, Lily (Aubrey Anderson-Emmons). The kids are only required to appear in 22 episodes.

== Episodes ==
No. overall	No. in season	Title	Directed by	Written by	Original release date	Prod. code	U.S. viewers (millions)
73	1	"Bringing Up Baby"	Steven Levitan	Paul Corrigan & Brad Walsh	September 26, 2012	4ARG01	14.44
Jay turns 65, and is kidnapped by Phil in an unconventional birthday celebration. Meanwhile, Cam and Mitch struggle after their attempts to adopt a baby, while Gloria struggles over how to reveal her pregnancy.
74	2	"Schooled"	Jeff Melman	Steven Levitan & Dan O'Shannon	October 10, 2012	4ARG03	12.08
Claire and Phil embarrass Haley when they drop her off at college. Manny makes Gloria and Jay take a class on how to care for a baby. Meanwhile, Lily gets into a tussle on her first day of kindergarten, and when Mitch and Cameron get into an argument with her assailant's lesbian parents, the principal orders them to have a play-date.
75	3	"Snip"	Gail Mancuso	Danny Zuker	October 10, 2012	4ARG02	12.31
Phil plans to get a vasectomy; Gloria is having difficulties coming to terms with the new weight she's gaining because of her pregnancy; Mitchell tries to steer Cameron toward getting a part-time job.
76	4	"The Butler's Escape"	Beth McCarthy-Miller	Bill Wrubel	October 17, 2012	4ARG04	12.28
Phil can't accept that Luke wants to quit magic; Gloria's snoring keeps Jay, Manny, and Stella awake; Mitch and Cam struggle to deal with their reversed roles as Cam takes on his new job as a music teacher. In the absence of Haley, Alex takes on a high-handed role as the new big sister in the house.
77	5	"Open House of Horrors"	James Bagdonas	Elaine Ko	October 24, 2012	4ARG06	12.52
Claire must rein in her enthusiasm for Halloween and keep her celebration kid-friendly; Phil decides to hold an open house on Halloween; Mitch and Cam have a costume party; Gloria's hormones make her more quick-tempered than usual. Manny questions his judgement when given the opportunity to hang with the 'cool' crowd in recognition of something he did not mean to do on purpose. Note: Sarah Hyland did not appear in this episode.
78	6	"Yard Sale"	Gail Mancuso	Abraham Higginbotham	October 31, 2012	4ARG05	10.62
Jay and Gloria hold a yard sale to help Manny and Luke with their school's charity fundraiser; in the process, Luke and Manny unearth an old trunk of Gloria's that she wishes to remain a secret. Mitch and Cam help Claire assess Alex's new 'boy friend'; Phil feels pressured to both sell and buy something; Mitchell struggles on how to tell a slimmer Cam that he is not fully confident he can keep his dietary practices going.
79	7	"Arrested"	Gail Mancuso	Becky Mann & Audra Sielaff	November 7, 2012	4ARG07	12.43
Haley has been arrested for under-aged drinking, so Phil and Claire must go fix the problem and take family lawyer, Mitchell, with them; Cameron stays back to watch over Alex and Luke, but they get into some crazy mishaps under his care; Jay gets out of baby shopping with Gloria, only to have to deal with a surprise visit from DeDe.
80	8	"Mistery Date"	Beth McCarthy-Miller	Jeffrey Richman	November 14, 2012	4ARG08	11.89
When Claire takes Manny and Luke along to Alex's academic decathlon for the weekend, Phil attempts to throw together a boys' night at the house, inviting a fellow Bulldogs alum (Matthew Broderick) he met at Cameron's gym. Meanwhile, the pressure is on for Alex at the decathlon; Manny meets a girl in the hotel lobby and decides to bar mitzvah hop with Luke throughout the hotel trying to find her; Cam and Mitch arrange for quite the surprise baby gift for Jay and Gloria.
81	9	"When a Tree Falls"	Steven Levitan	Ben Karlin	November 28, 2012	4ARG09	12.01
Mitchell is dragged into Cameron's quest to save an old tree, Jay and Phil have to compete at a kid's party, and Gloria and Claire go on the shopping trip from hell.
82	10	"Diamond in the Rough"	Gail Mancuso	Dan O'Shannon & Becky Mann & Audra Sielaff	December 12, 2012	4ARG11	10.94
Manny and Luke's little league team unexpectedly makes it into a playoff game, so Claire and Cameron scramble to find a location and decide to do a makeover on a rundown field. Inspired, Claire and Cam want to try their hand at flipping a house while they're at it, and Phil and Mitchell fight over who will be the bad guy to tell them no. Meanwhile, Gloria tries a bonding technique by using a microphone to sing to the baby in utero, which definitely incites a reaction from Jay. Manny enlists Luke's help to prepare for the game after unexpectedly being thrust onto the field after a season on the bench.
83	11	"New Year's Eve"	Fred Goss	Abraham Higginbotham & Jeffrey Richman	January 9, 2013	4ARG13	12.04
Jay's plan to have the family plan to celebrate New Year's together at a hotel in Palm Springs doesn't meet expectations; Alex and Haley are faced with challenges as they try to watch the kids back at home.
84	12	"Party Crasher"	Fred Savage	Danny Zuker & Christopher Lloyd	January 16, 2013	4ARG10	11.01
Gloria and Jay try to make Manny's 14th birthday extra special by planning a surprise party; Cam feels he has neglected Lily lately with his commitment to work which Mitchell interprets as his job not going well. Haley starts hanging out with a much older guy and Gloria gives birth.
85	13	"Fulgencio"	Lev L. Spiro	Bill Wrubel	January 23, 2013	4ARG12	10.83
When Gloria's mother and sister visit, they bring traditions, baby names and family baggage; Phil helps the kids with their problems; Mitchell and Cameron try to correct Lily's bad habits.
86	14	"A Slight at the Opera"	James Bagdonas	Paul Corrigan & Brad Walsh	February 6, 2013	4ARG14	9.83
Cameron is putting on the school production of "Phantom of the Opera," but when their star falls ill, Manny pulls all the stops to land the lead -- even if that means going against Luke. Meanwhile, Jay teaches Phil to golf and they wind up in a golf-off with Pepper and Mitch; Gloria takes Alex along on errands, which include a visit to a psychic. Claire’s adventures in babysitting Joe and Lily become a comedy of errors.
87	15	"Heart Broken"	Beth McCarthy-Miller	Danny Zuker	February 13, 2013	4ARG18	10.05
A fun Valentine’s Day romp between Phil and Claire’s alter egos, Clive Bixby and Juliana, takes an unexpected turn that lands Claire in the hospital with a diagnosis she doesn’t take lying down. Meanwhile, Gloria and Jay’s attempts to be romantic keep getting interrupted by the kids, which drives Gloria crazy; Cam and Mitch host a wild Valentine’s Day Lonely Hearts Party that leaves them hung over the next morning, trying to piece together what happened and, more importantly, why Dylan is now living with them.
88	16	"Bad Hair Day"	Gail Mancuso	Elaine Ko	February 20, 2013	4ARG16	10.62
Claire flies solo to her college reunion and runs into a professor she once dated, but when Phil shows up things get really awkward. Back at home, Jay is obsessed with winning his big bowling tournament, and Gloria is running ragged with the baby but won’t admit it. Mitchell offers to take baby Joe for a while, and Cameron seizes the opportunity to use him in one of his elaborate photo shoots. However, a wig malfunction leads to unfortunate results and no one wants to be the one to face Gloria.
89	17	"Best Men"	Steven Levitan	Teleplay by : Dan O'Shannon & Abraham Higginbotham; Story by : Dan O'Shannon & Abraham Higginbotham & Bianca Douglas	February 27, 2013	4ARG15	10.53
Mitch and Cam's friend Sal announces she's getting married the next day and wants them to be best men, but they can’t help but question whether this party girl can really settle down, and consider an intervention. Gloria has trust issues with the new nanny Dalia. Meanwhile, Gloria and Jay have to deal with Manny's art love for nude females, Claire has a rare bonding moment with Haley, and Phil helps Luke fix a date with a girl named Simone through Facebook.
90	18	"The Wow Factor"	Steven Levitan	Ben Karlin	March 27, 2013	4ARG17	9.09
Mitchell seeks to help Lily deal with a playground bully but goes too far in the process; Jay finds himself in trouble with Gloria when she finds him at a movie theatre during his bonding time with Joe; Cam and Claire are at odds over their home renovation and seek to influence Cam's lesbian friend Pam to side with their visions for a backyard idea; Phil's plans to show Alex and Haley the joys of home improvement hit a roadblock.
91	19	"The Future Dunphys"	Ryan Case	Elaine Ko	April 3, 2013	4ARG20	10.88
While at the hospital for a checkup, Claire and Phil see the older version of their family. To educate Lily and reconnect with her Vietnamese heritage, Cam, Mitchell, and Gloria take her out to a Vietnamese restaurant. During a prospective students tour of a high-end private school for Manny, Jay reinvigorates youthful desires to belong with the upper class crowd and unknowingly pressures Manny into a disastrously entertaining interview with the Dean.
92	20	"Flip Flop"	Gail Mancuso	Jeffrey Richman & Bill Wrubel	April 10, 2013	4ARG19	10.38
Gloria's ex-husband, Javiér (Benjamin Bratt) introduces his new girlfriend, Trish (Paget Brewster) to the family. Trish and Manny form a close bond and Gloria is worried about being replaced. However, when Javiér proposes to Trish, she runs upstairs. When Gloria asks her about Javiér's proposal she says she cannot live up to Gloria as a mother and a wife, at which point Gloria welcomes Trish to the family, now secure and no longer worried about the competition for Manny's affection. Claire and Cam are struggling to sell their flipped house after turning down an offer from Gil (Rob Riggle). Haley uses social network profiles to research a friend of Luke's, Zach (Anders Holm), in order to stage the house to his likes. At the house inspection Cam mentions Zach's dog name, Otis, and Zach freaks out at how personal the house has been staged and leaves. Gil comes to gloat, but Cam and Mitchell pretend to be interested in the property and Gil is willing to renegotiate for his buyer.
93	21	"Career Day"	Jim Hensz	Paul Corrigan & Brad Walsh	May 1, 2013	4ARG21	9.64
Gloria challenges Jay to write the thriller novel he says he put aside because of life and work commitments; Manny ends up writing for Jay instead. Phil is upstaged at Luke's Career Day by real estate rival, Gil Thorpe (Rob Riggle). Cam and Mitchell accidentally give Lily $100 for her tooth and try to get her to give the money back. Lily refuses, and says she will buy a bike with the money. They ask Haley to help, dressed up as the tooth fairy, to try to convince Lily but fails and gets caught, but Haley tells Lily she will be put on Santa's "naughty list" for the rest of her life, which convinces her to give the money back.
94	22	"My Hero"	Gail Mancuso	Abraham Higginbotham	May 8, 2013	4ARG22	9.02
Mitch’s ex-boyfriend, Teddy (Larry Sullivan), invites the Pritchett clan to a fund-raiser at the local roller rink. Cam is upset at how friendly and inclusive the rest of the family is with Teddy. Jay offers Claire a job, but Claire tries to avoid talking to him about it due to the bad time she had while previously working for him. Phil gives Gloria skating lessons. Haley gives Alex tips on how to flirt with boys. Manny and Luke have to complete a "My Hero" essay assignment on a family member for school.
95	23	"Games People Play"	Alisa Statman	Teleplay by : Ben Karlin; Story by : Danny Zuker	May 15, 2013	4ARG24	10.03
Phil gets a new RV after selling a house and plans to take the family for a summer road trip to Yellowstone National Park. To get a taste of the experience, he takes the family on a drive to the coast; little does he know, Claire plans to evoke the broiling turmoil between the kids while travelling together in the vehicle to cancel any plans for the trip. Jay and Gloria search for Manny's misplaced backpack but end up snooping through Cam & Mitchell's and Phil & Claire's houses. Jay & Gloria find out they were not invited to a games night hosted by Cam & Mitch and argue over the reason; unbeknownst to them, Manny forgot to hand them their invitation. Lily excels at a gymnastics competition, but Cam and Mitchell's competitive spirits has the rest of the parents turning on them.
96	24	"Goodnight Gracie"	Steven Levitan	Steven Levitan & Jeffrey Richman	May 22, 2013	4ARG23	10.01
Everyone flies down to Florida for Phil's mother's funeral. Her last wish, to have Phil set her widowed husband Frank (Fred Willard) up with another woman, puts Claire and Phil at ends. Cam spends time with a few residents of the retirement community and thrives on the gossip-fuelled nature of their relationships. Phil's mother leaves Alex a lighter that led to her meeting Phil's father and Alex comes to understand what she meant to her grandmother. Jay runs into the woman he lost his virginity to before shipping off to Vietnam, but she has trouble remembering him from her other conquests. Gloria faces court over an arrest warrant for running a brothel, and brings Mitchell to represent her. A successful day in the courtroom as a posturing lawyer for Gloria and many desperate citizens prompts Mitchell to want to return to working in the courts.

== Reception ==
The fourth season of Modern Family was met with mixed reviews. Willa Paskin of Salon gave the season a negative review, writing, "As Modern Family has gotten older, its characters, and their dynamics, have settled into grooves, some more discordant than others." Halfway through the season, Rachel Stein of Television Without Pity wrote, "much as I liked the pairings and some of the dialogue, ["New Year's Eve"] is just another contrived episode of Modern Family we can cite when we talk later about how a different show should have won the 2013 Emmy for Best Comedy."

On the other hand, Robert Bianco of USA Today gave the season a positive review, calling it "TV's most appreciated great comedy." In addition, The A.V. Club was often complimentary towards the season. All 24 episodes were reviewed, with "A−" and "B" as the most common letter grades assigned to a given one. Donna Bowman, reviewing "Goodnight Gracie," wrote that there were "few comedies on television more satisfying" when the season was at its best.

Some of the more well-received episodes include "Schooled," "Yard Sale," "Diamond in the Rough," and "Goodnight Gracie".

== Ratings ==
Viewership and ratings per episode of Modern Family season 4
No.	Title	Air date	Rating/share (18–49)	Viewers (millions)	DVR (18–49)	DVR viewers (millions)	Total (18–49)	Total viewers (millions)
1	"Bringing Up Baby"	September 26, 2012	5.5/15 (3)	14.44 (7)	2.3	4.41	7.8	18.84
2	"Schooled"	October 10, 2012	4.8/13 (5)	12.08 (9)	2.5	4.91	7.4	17.21
3	"Snip"	October 10, 2012	4.9/12 (3)	12.31 (9)	2.0	4.91	6.8	17.21
4	"The Butler's Escape"	October 17, 2012	4.7/12 (4)	12.28 (9)	2.3	4.34	7.0	16.62
5	"Open House of Horrors"	October 24, 2012	4.9/13 (3)	12.52 (11)	2.4	4.81	7.3	17.33
6	"Yard Sale"	October 31, 2012	4.2/12 (6)	10.52 (20)	2.1	4.42	6.3	15.04
7	"Arrested"	November 7, 2012	4.8/12 (3)	12.43 (6)	2.1	4.35	6.9	16.76
8	"Misery Date"	November 14, 2012	4.6/12 (3)	11.89 (11)	2.2	4.64	6.8	16.52
9	"When a Tree Falls"	November 28, 2012	4.7/12 (3)	12.01 (13)	2.3	4.40	7.0	16.40
10	"Diamond in the Rough"	December 12, 2012	4.2/11 (4)	10.94 (13)	2.5	4.99	6.7	15.93
11	"New Year's Eve"	January 9, 2013	4.7/12 (4)	12.04 (9)	2.3	4.63	7.0	16.68
12	"Party Crasher"	January 16, 2013	4.3/11 (5)	11.01 (16)	2.1	4.51	6.4	15.51
13	"Fulgencio"	January 23, 2013	4.2/11 (3)	10.83 (12)	2.5	5.11	6.7	15.94
14	"A Slight at the Opera"	February 6, 2013	3.7/10 (9)	9.83 (19)	2.3	4.65	6.0	14.48
15	"Heart Broken"	February 13, 2013	3.8/10 (3)	10.05 (10)	2.3	4.54	6.1	14.59
16	"Bad Hair Day"	February 20, 2013	4.0/11 (6)	10.62 (16)	2.2	4.54	6.2	15.16
17	"Best Men"	February 27, 2013	3.9/10 (1)	10.53 (9)	2.3	4.72	6.3	15.29
18	"The Wow Factor"	March 27, 2013	3.2/9 (5)	9.09 (15)	2.3	4.67	5.5	13.76
19	"The Future Dunphys"	April 3, 2013	4.2/11 (7)	10.88 (16)	2.1	4.41	6.3	15.29
20	"Flip Flop"	April 10, 2013	3.8/10 (4)	10.38 (16)	1.9	3.98	5.7	14.36
21	"Career Day"	May 1, 2013	3.6/10 (4)	9.64 (17)	2.2	4.45	5.8	14.09
22	"My Hero"	May 8, 2013	3.3/10 (5)	9.02 (20)	1.9	4.03	5.2	13.05
23	"Games People Play"	May 15, 2013	3.7/10 (3)	10.03 (14)	2.0	4.09	5.6	13.90
24	"Goodnight Gracie"	May 22, 2013	3.7/11 (1)	10.01 (6)	2.1	4.18	5.8	14.20

== Awards and nominations ==
=== Primetime Emmy Awards ===
The fourth season received twelve nominations at the 65th Primetime Emmy Awards in total, including its fourth consecutive nomination for Outstanding Comedy Series. The ceremony for the Primetime Awards was aired on September 22, 2013, on CBS. The Primetime Creative Arts Awards took place on September 15, 2013.

Primetime Awards
Year	Category	Nominees	For role/episode	Outcome
2013	Outstanding Comedy Series	Modern Family		Won
2013	Outstanding Supporting Actor in Comedy Series	Ty Burrell	Phil Dunphy	Nominated
2013	Outstanding Supporting Actor in Comedy Series	Jesse Tyler Ferguson	Mitchell Pritchett	Nominated
2013	Outstanding Supporting Actor in Comedy Series	Ed O'Neill	Jay Pritchett	Nominated
2013	Outstanding Supporting Actress in Comedy Series	Julie Bowen	Claire Dunphy	Nominated
2013	Outstanding Supporting Actress in Comedy Series	Sofia Vergara	Gloria Delgado-Pritchett	Nominated
2013	Outstanding Directing for a Comedy Series	Gail Mancuso	Episode: "Arrested"	Won
Primetime Creative Arts Awards
Year	Category	Nominees	For role/episode	Outcome
2013	Outstanding Casting for a Comedy Series	Jeff Greenberg		Nominated
2013	Outstanding Guest Actor in a Comedy Series	Nathan Lane	Role: Pepper Saltzman; Episode: "A Slight at the Opera"	Nominated
2013	Outstanding Single-Camera Picture; Editing for a Comedy Series	Ryan Case	Episode: "Party Crasher"	Nominated
2013	Outstanding Sound Mixing for a Comedy or Drama Series (Half-Hour) and Animation	Modern Family	Episode: "My Hero"	Nominated
2013	Outstanding Stunt Coordination for a Comedy Series or a Variety Program	Jim Sharp		Nominated

== Home Media release ==
The Fourth season of Modern Family was released on DVD and Blu-ray both in a three-disc set on September 24, 2013. The box-set contains all 24 episodes plus the extended director's cut version of the season finale, commentaries from the writers of the show on several episodes, deleted and alternate scenes, a blooper reel and more. This was the final season of the series that had a Blu-ray release, as all of the subsequent seasons were released on DVD and Digital HD only.

Modern Family: The Complete Fourth Season
Set Details		Special Features
24 episodes (1 Extended); 3-disc set; 1.78:1 aspect ratio; English (Dolby Digital 5.1) (DVD); English (DTS-HD Master Audio 5.1) (Blu-ray); Subtitles: English, French, Spanish and Portuguese; Audio Commentaries; Runtime: 519 minutes		"Goodnight Gracie" Director's Cut; Audio Commentaries from the Modern Family writers on 4 episodes: "Party Crasher" with Danny Zuker and Bill Wrubel; "Fulgencio" with Danny Zuker and Bill Wrubel; "Career Day" with Steven Levitan, Brad Walsh and Paul Corrigan; "Goodnight Gracie" with Steven Levitan and Jeffrey Richman; Deleted and Alternate Scenes; An Addition to the Family; A Day with Eric; A Modern Family Guide to Parenting; Modern Family Writing; Gag Reel
Release Dates
Region 1	Region 2	Region 4
September 24, 2013	November 5, 2013	November 15, 2013
