= Games People Play (Modern Family) =

- Modern Family episode
- Episode no.: Season 4 Episode 23
- Directed by: Alisa Statman
- Story by: Danny Zuker
- Teleplay by: Ben Karlin
- Production code: 4ARG24
- Original air date: May 15, 2013

Guest appearances
- Matt Malloy as Pat; Lenny Jacobson as Tony

Episode chronology
← Previous "My Hero"	Next → "Goodnight Gracie"
- Modern Family season 4

"Games People Play" is the 23rd episode of the fourth season of the American sitcom Modern Family, and the series' 95th episode overall. It was aired on May 15, 2013. The episode was written by Ben Karlin based on a story by Danny Zuker and it was directed by Alisa Statman.

== Plot ==
Phil (Ty Burrell) gets a new RV after selling a house and he wants to go to Yellowstone National Park for the summer, so he takes everyone on a test-drive just to get a taste of what the trip will be like. Claire (Julie Bowen) believes that the trip with an RV is not a good idea because she knows that having all the kids together in the same place can easily turn into a disaster. Without saying anything to Phil, the five of them set off.she lets him discover it by himself. At first the kids behave nicely, which frustrates Claire; but then a bee gets into the car and chaos ensues. Phil gets mad at Claire and the kids as he just wants a nice family vacation together. In the end, all of them work things out.

In the meantime, Manny (Rico Rodriguez) tries to find his backpack that he thinks he has left in Luke's (Nolan Gould) room. Gloria (Sofía Vergara) breaks into the house along with him and Jay (Ed O'Neill) to search for it. Capitalizing on the situation, Gloria and Jay end up snooping through Phil and Claire's stuff, something that they also do later at Mitch (Jesse Tyler Ferguson) and Cameron's (Eric Stonestreet) house once Manny remembers that his backpack is not in Luke's room but at Mitch and Cam's house instead. While snooping around, they find out that they were not invited to a game night and they start wondering why Mitch and Cam did not invite them. It is then revealed that Manny has forgotten to give them the invitation to the game night, and decides to hide it after condemning them for not being game night material. Later they found out that Manny hid the invitation, but decide not to get mad at him.

Meanwhile, Lily (Aubrey Anderson-Emmons) participates at a gymnastics competition and she does great. Cam and Mitch's competitive spirits, along with a series of miscommunications, though, gets them frowned upon by the parents of other kids.

== Reception ==
=== Ratings ===
In its original American broadcast, "Games People Play" was watched by 10.03 million; up 1.01 from the previous episode.

=== Reviews ===
"Games People Play" received positive reviews.

Leigh Raines from TV Fanatic rated the episode 4.5/5. "The Pritchett clan ranks high among TV's most competitive families. In "Games People Play," we saw just how much their competitive nature can rub off on other loved ones."

Michael Adams of 411mania gave the episode 8/10 saying that the episode was "just so enjoyable". "Not too much going on, no real craziness, just 3 simple story-lines that all had very funny moments. This is what a sitcom should be."

Donna Bowman of The A.V. Club gave a B grade to the episode.

Despite the good reviews, Zack Dionne from Vulture rated the episode only with 2/5 stating that last week's family affair at the roller rink (see episode 22) is a tough act to follow.
