= Arrested (Modern Family) =

- Modern Family episode
- Episode no.: Season 4 Episode 7
- Directed by: Gail Mancuso
- Written by: Becky Mann; Audra Sielaff
- Production code: 4ARG07
- Original air date: November 7, 2012

Guest appearances
- Shelley Long as Dede Pritchett; James McCaley as Dean Miller; Joe Adler as Aidan Schwartz

Episode chronology
← Previous "Yard Sale"	Next → "Mistery Date"
- Modern Family season 4

"Arrested" is the seventh episode of the fourth season of the American sitcom Modern Family, and the series' 79th episode overall. It aired November 7, 2012. The episode was written by Becky Mann & Audra Sielaff and directed by Gail Mancuso.

== Plot ==
Phil (Ty Burrell) and Claire (Julie Bowen) get a phone call in the middle of the night from the police because Haley (Sarah Hyland) has been arrested for underage drinking. Claire calls Mitchell (Jesse Tyler Ferguson) to ask him to accompany them to bail her out in case she needs a lawyer. At the police station, they find out that Haley not only was drinking, but also resisted arrest and assaulted a police officer. After being bailed out, Haley must attend a disciplinary hearing at school. Haley attempts to make excuses for her behavior, but Phil, in a rare display of parental authority, tells her that she needs to start taking responsibility. Haley takes these words to heart, but goes too far and, instead of defending herself at the hearing, blurts out everything illegal she has done since the day she started college and ends up getting expelled. She goes back home with Phil and Claire, who are disappointed, but proud that she is taking responsibility for her actions.

Meanwhile, Cameron (Eric Stonestreet) has stayed back to look after Alex (Ariel Winter) and Luke (Nolan Gould). He serves them soy bacon for breakfast without knowing that Luke is allergic to soy, so they rush to the emergency room. While there, Alex enjoys proving herself to be smarter than the training doctors, although later she passes out while watching a C-section.

Gloria (Sofia Vergara) wants to go baby shopping but Jay (Ed O'Neill) gets out of it — only to get a surprise visitor: DeDe (Shelley Long). He tries to get rid of her quickly so she will not find out that Gloria is pregnant, but he does not quite manage to do it before Gloria returns.

== Reception ==
=== Ratings ===
In its original American broadcast, "Arrested" was watched by 12.43 million; up 1.81 from the previous episode.

=== Reviews ===
"Arrested" received positive reviews from critics.

Donna Bowman of The A.V. Club gave a B− grade to the episode saying that Haley's return will offer good things in the future episodes. "She’s [Haley] moving back home, and the whole gang’s back together, at least until she reapplies next year. The episode that engineers this reunion might be fairly ordinary, but with Haley returning as a foil for Alex and a trial for her parents, good consequences could be in the offing."

Leigh Raines of TV Fanatic rated "Arrested" with a 5/5, saying, "Call it November Sweeps if you want, but Modern Family hasn't busted out an episode this good in weeks. [...] I always say that my favorite episodes of Modern Family are the ones that feel the most relatable. [...] After a few weeks without our beloved resident ditz, Haley was back on the scene and stealing the show. [...] Either way, I'm happy to have Haley back and I'm happy that Claire didn't have to play bad cop for once. Phil really stepped up to the plate. Someone get that man a waffle!"

Dalene Rovenstine of Paste Magazine rated the episode with 9.1/10 saying that the best part of the episode was Mitchell. "Being the brunt of lawyer jokes [...] gives Jesse Tyler Ferguson the chance to step outside of his normal, stuffy character and provide some comic relief."

Denise Chang from No White Noise rated the episode with 4/4 saying that overall it was a fun episode and she enjoyed it very much. "The subplots in this episode stepped down from anything too intense unlike last week and allowed the main storyline to really pop. The funny factor was jacked up in the subplots and complimented Haley’s serious issue very well."

Britt Hayes from Screen Crush said that this was on the better episodes of the season. ""Arrested" is definitely one of the better episodes of this season, where the writers have given the characters more to work with than playing the same types. [...] This isn’t necessarily a bad thing. Modern Family is a sitcom with a proven formula and characters with traits that define who they are on a comedic level. But when the show steps out of the box and recognizes that people don’t always play to type, that’s when it can really catch you off guard."

Michael Adams from 411mania rated the episode with 8/10 saying that it was great. "It [Arrested] gave every character, even Lily, a chance to have their moment, which is one of the many things I love about this show. [...] Another thing I liked about this episode was that it gave us some story progression, as Haley is now back home."

Pollysgotyournumbers from Bitch Stole My Remote also gave a good review to the episode stating: "...I actually find myself looking forward to more Haley adventures and maybe they’ll even have the far too overlooked Dylan (Reid Ewing) back for more adorable Haley worship. Yeah, the more I think about it, the more I approve of where this is going. There are far more potentially funny scenarios with Haley back than with her away at college…"

=== Accolades ===
Gail Mancuso received the Primetime Emmy Award for Outstanding Directing for a Comedy Series for this episode.
