= The Future Dunphys =

- Modern Family episode
- Episode no.: Season 4 Episode 19
- Directed by: Ryan Case
- Written by: Elaine Ko
- Production code: 4ARG20
- Original air date: April 3, 2013

Guest appearances
- Justine Bateman as Angela; Richard Riehle as Norman; Anastasia Basil as Sydney; Luka Jones as Dustin; John Cygan as Admissions Dean; Brian Palermo as Dryden dad

Episode chronology
← Previous "The Wow Factor"	Next → "Flip Flop"
- Modern Family season 4

"The Future Dunphys" is the 19th episode of the fourth season of the American sitcom Modern Family, and the series' 91st episode overall. It was aired on April 3, 2013. The episode was written by Elaine Ko and it was directed by Ryan Case.

== Plot ==
Claire (Julie Bowen) and Phil (Ty Burrell) visit the hospital for a check up after Claire's heart episode back on Valentine's Day. While waiting, they see an older version of their family and they start to freak out and worry for the future of their children, calling them and making Haley (Sarah Hyland), Alex (Ariel Winter) and Luke (Nolan Gould) worried that Claire's condition is serious. When the kids arrive at the hospital to see what is going on, they realize that everything is fine, and they berate Phil and Claire for stressing them out, just as a younger version of their family nearby watches.

Lily (Aubrey Anderson-Emmons) starts asking "girly" questions to Mitch (Jesse Tyler Ferguson) and Cam (Eric Stonestreet) but the two of them call Gloria (Sofía Vergara) for help as they are unexperienced in the matter. As soon as Gloria leaves the house with Lily, Lily claims that she is a homosexual. While talking with her, Mitch, Cam, and Gloria realize there was just a misunderstanding caused by a conversation Lily had with a schoolmate. As such, they decide to educate her about her heritage by taking her out to a Vietnamese restaurant. There, Lily admits to falsely claiming her sexuality so that Mitch and Cam would feel better.

Gloria is worried over the fact that Manny is losing most of his Spanish knowledge, and projects her fears onto Lily's situation. In the end, she decides to take Manny and Jay to Colombia in the summer to keep them in touch with her heritage.

Meanwhile, Jay (Ed O'Neill) takes Manny (Rico Rodriguez) to an exclusive private school for an interview. During a prospective students' tour, Jay's secret childhood desire to fit in with the upper class crowd resurfaces, and he realizes he could live vicariously through Manny. Jay puts too much pressure on Manny, which stresses him out, leading to his botching his own interview.

== Reception ==
=== Ratings ===
In its original American broadcast, "The Future Dunphys" was watched by 10.88 million; up 1.79 from the previous episode.

=== Reviews ===
"The Future Dunphys" received positive reviews.

Donna Bowman of The A.V. Club gave a B grade to the episode saying that the episode's separate storylines succeeded in crafting big laughs. "Modern Family tends to do best with episodes that limit the number of separate subplots, either by deliberate discipline or by creating storylines that split and merge."

Leigh Raines from TV Fanatic rated the episode with 3/5 saying that this was not one of her favorite episodes but still, there were a lot of hilarious lines.

Zach Dionne from the Vulture, rated the episode with 4/5 saying that it was an exciting episode "dressed up as a cookie-cutter one."
