= Mistery Date =

- Modern Family episode
- Episode no.: Season 4 Episode 8
- Directed by: Beth McCarthy-Miller
- Written by: Jeffrey Richman
- Production code: 4ARG08
- Original air date: November 14, 2012

Guest appearance
- Matthew Broderick as Dave

Episode chronology
← Previous "Arrested"	Next → "When a Tree Falls"
- Modern Family season 4

"Mistery Date" is the eighth episode of the fourth season of the American sitcom Modern Family, and the series' 80th episode overall. It aired November 14, 2012. The episode was written by Jeffrey Richman and directed by Beth McCarthy-Miller.

Ty Burrell submitted this episode for consideration due to his nomination for the Primetime Emmy Award for Outstanding Supporting Actor in a Comedy Series at the 65th Primetime Emmy Awards.

== Plot ==
Alex (Ariel Winter) is participating at the academic decathlon. Claire (Julie Bowen) drives her there for the weekend, bringing Manny (Rico Rodriguez) and Luke (Nolan Gould) along. Alex is removed in the first round of the competition. Claire unsuccessfully tries convincing the judges to accept her back.

Manny meets a girl in the hotel lobby whom he comes to believe is the love of his life. He and Luke decide to attend all of the bar mitzvahs throughout the hotel in an attempt to find her.

Meanwhile, Phil (Ty Burrell) is home alone. After Claire's encouragement not to spend the weekend alone, he attempts to arrange a boys' night, inviting fellow Bulldogs alumnus Dave (Matthew Broderick), with whom he was acquainted at Cameron's (Eric Stonestreet) gym. Dave is gay and Cam, not knowing the guy Dave met is Phil, believes that Phil has invited him over for other reasons.

Cam and Mitch (Jesse Tyler Ferguson) want to make a surprise baby gift for Jay (Ed O'Neill) and Gloria (Sofia Vergara). In order for the surprise to be successful, they must keep Jay and Gloria out of their house for approximately four hours. Cam takes Gloria for lunch and Mitch takes his dad to the store. Being together during the day, Mitch sees that something is bothering Jay. He attempts to find out what is wrong but ultimately meets with difficulty because Jay is unwilling to discuss things with his son.

== Reception ==
=== Ratings ===
In its original American broadcast, "Mistery Date" was watched by 11.89 million; down 0.54 from the previous episode.

=== Reviews ===
"Mistery Date" received generally positive reviews from television critics.

Shayelizatrotter from The Comedy Critic gave the episode an A− grade, saying that it was entertaining: "Overall, I thought this was a very amusing episode with such comical character interaction throughout all of the storylines."

Denise Chang from No White Noise gave the episode a B+ grade, saying that she would give the episode a 4/5 laughs on the funny scale and that the show effectively balanced humor and serious topics. "Overall, Phil’s plot line made up for any other inadequacies this episode had (which were not that many anyway) and bumped the laughs to a 4 out of 5!"

Leigh Raines of TV Fanatic rated "Mistery Date" a 4.5/5, while Zach Dionne of Vulture rated it 5/5, saying that it was "just a Really Good Episode."

Jules of Two Cents TV gave a good review: "One simple action or gesture can have a whole lot of meaning. While some believe in one thing, others are just oblivious to see what is really going on. Such misunderstandings always make well for a comedy and this week we have some good and not-so good examples of it."

Britt Hayes from Screen Crush also gave a good review, stating: "Though the Bar Mitzvah stuff with Manny and Luke doesn’t amount to much, the rest of the episode does what ‘Modern Family’ does best: subverts expectation, gives its characters real depth and humanity, and finds hilarity in the increasingly absurd."

Dalene Rovenstine of Paste Magazine rated the episode a 7.4/10, saying that even though she found the episode average, she liked it: "If I had to rank this episode (which I do), I would say it’s pretty average, but for some reason I like it more than that. There isn’t anything spectacular about it: the storylines aren’t intensely intriguing, but there is just enough quality dialogue sprinkled throughout that I was happy to keep watching."

Donna Bowman of The A.V. Club gave a C+ grade to the episode, saying: "This episode almost plays like a challenge: Break up the ensemble into random pairs, perhaps by drawing out of a hat, and create comedy out of something that might happen to those pairs. . . . In an episode where everything plays out pretty much as expected, the ending of Phil’s storyline proves exceptionally beautiful. "

Michael Adams of 411mania gave a mixed review, rating the episode 6.5/10. He praised the storyline between Phil and Dave and said that the story alone would give the episode a 10 if it were solely about them: "The minute he [Dave] called up Cam and revealed what he thought was going to happen, I was hysterical. Then, all the innuendos while they were watching the game were fantastic! I thought the two men really played off each other very well, and would totally be on board with Dave coming back."
