= Diamond in the Rough (Modern Family) =

- Modern Family episode
- Episode no.: Season 4 Episode 10
- Directed by: Gail Mancuso
- Written by: Dan O'Shannon; Becky Mann; Audra Sielaff
- Production code: 4ARG11
- Original air date: December 12, 2012

Guest appearance
- Irene Roseen as Mrs. Brooks

Episode chronology
← Previous "When a Tree Falls"	Next → "New Year's Eve"
- Modern Family season 4

"Diamond in the Rough" is the 10th episode of the fourth season of the American sitcom Modern Family, and the series' 82nd episode overall. It aired December 12, 2012. The episode was written by Dan O'Shannon, Becky Mann & Audra Sielaff and directed by Gail Mancuso.

== Plot ==
Manny (Rico Rodriguez) and Luke's (Nolan Gould) little league baseball team unexpectedly makes it into a playoff game, so Claire (Julie Bowen) and Cameron (Eric Stonestreet) scramble to find a location for the team to compete. They find an empty lot and decide to do a makeover on it transforming it into a baseball field. Later, Claire and Cameron come across an elderly woman selling her run-down house cheaply, and inspired by their efforts with the baseball field decide they want to try their hand at 'flipping' it (buying it, renovating and then selling it for a profit). Phil (Ty Burrell) and Mitchell (Jesse Tyler Ferguson) think it's a bad idea that will just end up losing them money, but while Mitchell tells them immediately that it is not a good idea, Phil pretends that he supports Claire. A conflict between Phil and Mitchell starts but in the end, when they see what a great job their partners did with the field, they have second thoughts about buying that house. Jay (Ed O'Neill) later comes by and tells all four of them that family and business do not go together, however they still end up buying the house.

Gloria (Sofia Vergara) tries to bond with the unborn baby by using a microphone to sing to it in utero. Jay does not like that at all since Gloria is a terrible singer and hearing her all day singing is not the best thing; however, he cannot tell her that, much to his chagrin. In the thought that the poor baby has to hear that all day, he decides to take the microphone with the excuse that he also wants to talk to the baby. In the end, he finally confesses to Gloria after the two of them struck a deal to not fight when Gloria is still carrying the baby, which angers Gloria.

At the game, Manny and Luke's team finally won after Manny is hit by a pitch and walks in the winning run.

== Reception ==
=== Ratings ===
In its original American broadcast, "Diamond in the Rough" was watched by 10.94 million; down 1.07 from the previous episode.

=== Reviews ===
"Diamond in the Rough" received generally positive reviews.

Donna Bowman of The A.V. Club gave a A− grade saying: "Sitcoms through the decades have used the family as their setting and their primary situation. Whether the family is bound by marriage and blood, or whether it’s a substitute family bound by friendship or the workplace, the reasons families are the perfect comedic situation are the same. Families can’t get away from each other."

Leigh Raines of TV Fanatic rated "Diamond in the Rough" with a 4/5 saying that it reminded her the episode Punkin Chunkin of Season 3. "This week's Modern Family actually reminded me a bit of the episode on Modern Family Season 3 called "Punkin Chunkin." It was all about the dreamers versus the realists. "Diamond In The Rough" presented the same kind of look at the relationships between the characters in the Dunphy-Pritchitt families. Except this time instead of dreamers and realists, it was gas pedals and brakes. It also switched up the roles a little."

Dalene Rovenstine of Paste Magazine rated the episode with 7.9/10 saying that the conflict between Mitchell and Phil is what saved the episode since it is a duo we don't see often. "Overall, it wasn’t the strongest episode. Flipping seemed fitting since this season has flip-flopped a lot … as did last season. Crossing fingers for more evil Phil and Mitchell; it could be what saves the show."

Victoria Leigh Miller from Yahoo! TV said that the episode was a gem. "This week's "Modern Family" episode started out a little rough but transformed into a gem as the Pritchett-Dunphy clan teamed up to make over a Little League baseball field with a second storyline that was(n't) music to our ears!"

Michael Adams of 411mania gave the episode 9/10 praising the "fight lines" between Phil and Mitchell saying that they were "comedy gold". "I loved this episode! One of the best of the season, and one of the best of the series. I thought it was one of the best written episodes they've ever put out and should defiantly [sic] be entered as their episode for writing when Emmy time rolls around."
