= New Year's Eve (Modern Family) =

- Modern Family episode
- Episode no.: Season 4 Episode 11
- Directed by: Fred Goss
- Written by: Abraham Higginbotham; Jeffrey Richman
- Production code: 4ARG13
- Original air date: January 9, 2013

Guest appearances
- Lainie Kazan as Eleanor; Billy Dee Williams as himself

Episode chronology
| ← Previous "Diamond in the Rough" | Next → "Party Crasher" |
- Modern Family season 4

"New Year's Eve" is the 11th episode of the fourth season of the American sitcom Modern Family, and the series' 83rd episode overall. It aired January 9, 2013. The episode was written by Abraham Higginbotham & Jeffrey Richman and directed by Fred Goss.

== Plot ==
It is New Year's Eve, and Jay (Ed O'Neill) wants to celebrate it with his family (his wife, his kids, and their husbands) by taking them to a hotel in Palm Springs. Jay visited the hotel in the past and speaks highly of it. Unfortunately, the hotel, being much older, is not what it was. Claire (Julie Bowen) wants to have sex with Phil (Ty Burrell) and learns of a nearby hot spring from the bell boy. Mitch (Jesse Tyler Ferguson) wants to feel young again, so he and Cam (Eric Stonestreet) also want to ditch dinner. Jay takes Gloria to sleep, but when he returns, everyone else has gone. Jay ends up playing poker with the owner of the hotel (Lainie Kazan) and her friends, which include Billy Dee Williams.

Phil and Claire strip and make love at the hot spring, but the demented bellboy forgot to say that nudists come there to celebrate the New Year as well. Now they are stuck with a bunch of naked people in a small hot spring with their clothes buried under a pile of clothes.

After Mitch and Cameron escape from dinner, they attempt to go to a bar to relive their youth. But the bar is full of young people in sleeveless clothes, while they are in formal wear. They try another place, which, although it is not shown, can be presumed to be a strip club. Finally, on their third try, they end up in a gay bar made up of men twice their age.

Meanwhile, Alex (Ariel Winter) and Haley (Sarah Hyland) are left back home babysitting the younger kids, Luke (Nolan Gould), Manny (Rico Rodriguez) and Lily (Aubrey Anderson-Emmons). Luke invites two girls over, one for him and one for Manny. Luke takes his date up to his room, making it awkward for Haley and Alex, while Manny's date is a sullen, depressed weirdo who shuns his gracious hosting. Meanwhile, Lily is left completely unattended and, at one point, rings the doorbell, claiming to have seen a coyote.

== Reception ==
=== Ratings ===
In its original American broadcast, "New Year's Eve" was watched by 12.04 million; up 1.1 from the previous episode.

=== Reviews ===
"New Year's Eve" received generally positive reviews.

Ryan McGee of The A.V. Club gave a B+ grade saying that the episode was not one of the funniest but it was one of the most heartfelt. ""New Year’s Eve", which gives tonight's Modern Family episode its title, promises both the chance for a fresh start as well as a potentially stark reminder that life only moves forward in time. [...] "New Year’s Eve" wasn't the funniest episode this season by a long stretch, but it was one of its most heartfelt. Sometimes, that's more than enough."

Leigh Raines of TV Fanatic rated "New Year's Eve" with a 4.5/5."I think most people would agree that "New Year's Eve" is perhaps the most overrated and disappointing holiday there is. And in a hotel that looked like it hadn't changed the sheets since the mid-70s, Jay's family was bound to be let down."

Dalene Rovenstine of Paste Magazine rated the episode with 8.3/10.

Michael Adams from 411mania gave the episode 7/10 saying that it was not too memorable. "Although it's 10 days late, the Modern Family New Year's Eve, showed NYE from every point of view, romantic, unexpected, spontaneous, quiet/alone, and I thought each story was nicely done, but the episode as a whole was just alright. It was funny at times, as the show always is, but it wasn't too memorable."
