= Yard Sale (Modern Family) =

- Modern Family episode
- Episode no.: Season 4 Episode 6
- Directed by: Gail Mancuso
- Written by: Abraham Higginbotham
- Production code: 4ARG05
- Original air date: October 31, 2012

Guest appearance
- Joe Metcalf as Michael

Episode chronology
← Previous "Open House of Horrors"	Next → "Arrested"
- Modern Family season 4

"Yard Sale" is the sixth episode of the fourth season of the American sitcom Modern Family, and the series' 78th episode overall. It aired October 31, 2012. The episode was written by Abraham Higginbotham and directed by Gail Mancuso.

Sofía Vergara submitted this episode for consideration due to her nomination for the Primetime Emmy Award for Outstanding Supporting Actress in a Comedy Series at the 65th Primetime Emmy Awards.

== Plot ==
Manny (Rico Rodriguez) and Luke (Nolan Gould) have a school charity fundraiser and Jay (Ed O'Neill) and Gloria (Sofia Vergara) decide to help them raise some money by holding a yard sale. In the process of it, Manny and Luke are looking for things to sell and they find an old trunk in the attic. When Gloria sees it she gets mad and takes it away from them. Her behavior makes the two boys curious and they want to see what Gloria is hiding from everyone.

Phil (Ty Burrell) discovers his old cycle and Claire (Julie Bowen) thinks he is finally going to sell it, but he is not. In the meantime, Jay wants to sell his motorcycle since he will not need it anymore, especially with the baby coming. To prove that he is not afraid of riding a motorcycle, Phil is riding it and goes for a test drive. But when he takes off from the house, he falls and gets trapped under the motorcycle. It takes him a while to free himself and get back home. When he finally does, he admits that he is not a motorcycle-rider and he will not be buying the bike.

Cam (Eric Stonestreet) wants to sell his "fat-pants" since he does not need them anymore. Mitchell (Jesse Tyler Ferguson) though, who is not very confident that Cam will keep his dietary practices going, struggles on how to tell him that he should not sell his pants because every time he loses weight and gains it back, he needs to buy new ones.

Meanwhile, Alex's (Ariel Winter) new boyfriend, Michael (Joe Metcalf), comes to the yard sale. Claire believes that Michael is gay and she tries to convince Alex because she does not want her to get hurt. To be more convincing, she asks for Mitchell and Cam's help. When they also tell Alex that Michael is gay, she decides to ask him herself.

== Reception ==
=== Ratings ===
In its original American broadcast, "Yard Sale" was watched by 10.62 million; down 1.9 from the previous episode.

=== Reviews ===
"Yard Sale" received positive reviews.

Donna Bowman of The A.V. Club gave a B+ grade to the episode saying: "When a sitcom gets all its major characters together in a single, extended, episode-long scene, you can be sure of one thing: They will form into groups, stand a few scant feet away from another character, and talk about that character as if they can’t be heard. I love this trope. [...] Every time it happens, I’m reminded of the artificiality of the entertainment format that I’m enjoying, its conventions, tricks, and shortcuts. The single-camera laugh-track-less sitcom dispenses with so many of those concessions to theatrical necessity, that I find myself appreciating them even more when they appear. Those moments are a signal that the creative team is celebrating the sitcom form, not fleeing it. [...] Sometimes the old ways are the best. Modern Family has that venerable sitcom DNA despite its 21st century trappings, and “Yard Sale” continues a concerted season four effort to stay close to those roots."

Leigh Raines of TV Fanatic rated "Yard Sale" with a 4.5/5 saying that a lot of things can happen in few hours. "A lot can happen in a few hours on Modern Family. Leave it to a regular old "Yard Sale" for Phil to have a James Franco moment, Luke to manipulate people, Alex to fight and make up with her gay boyfriend, Cam and Mitchell to have seven fights and Gloria to realize she married her puppet."

Victoria Leigh Miller from Yahoo! TV said that the episode was priceless. "...while the Pritchett-Dunphy-Delgado-Tucker clan fell short of selling refreshments at their sale (think Hyde's "special brownies" on "That '70s Show's" garage sale episode), the hijinks on this episode were refreshing enough! [...] So how much money did the family's yard sale make for UNICEF? We're not sure, but this episode was priceless."

Denise Chang from No White Noise rated the episode with an A− grade saying that "Yard Sale" was a wonderful and overall great episode. "Overall, this was a really great episode that explored a couple of important topics and gets a 3/5 laughs from me on the funny scale. Hayley made a short appearance via video chat and I can’t wait to see more."

Zach Dionne of Vulture rated the episode with 4/5. "A yard sale at the Pritchett-Delgado headquarters — what a wonderful way to get the entire dysfunctional Modern Family clan together for some recently lacking comedy team action."

Michael Adams of 411mania rated the episode with 8/10 saying that it was not bad at all while Wyner C of Two Cents TV said that "the episode was okay but the ending rocked!!!"

Phil's moment as James Franco from the movie 127 Hours got positive feedback. "Is it possible Phil did James Franco better than James Franco himself? What started out as Wild Hogs turned into 127 Hours when Phil tipped Jay's Harley over and caught his pants underneath it. If only he was wearing his shants! I'd probably watch a whole episode of Modern Family with Phil recording himself like he was in The Blair Witch Project. He is a one-man comedy show."
