= My Hero (Modern Family) =

- Modern Family episode
- Episode no.: Season 4 Episode 22
- Directed by: Gail Mancuso
- Written by: Abraham Higginbotham
- Production code: 4ARG22
- Original air date: May 8, 2013

Guest appearances
- Larry Sullivan as Teddy; Lex Medlin as Jeff

Episode chronology
← Previous "Career Day"	Next → "Games People Play"
- Modern Family season 4

"My Hero" is the 22nd episode of the fourth season of the American sitcom Modern Family, and the series' 94th episode overall. It was aired on May 8, 2013. The episode was written by Abraham Higginbotham and it was directed by Gail Mancuso.

Julie Bowen submitted this episode for consideration due to her nomination for the Primetime Emmy Award for Outstanding Supporting Actress in a Comedy Series at the 65th Primetime Emmy Awards.

== Plot ==
Mitch (Jesse Tyler Ferguson) and Cam (Eric Stonestreet) encounter Mitch's ex-boyfriend, Teddy (Larry Sullivan), who invites them to a fundraiser at the local roller rink. Cam has no problem hanging out with someone who was dating Mitch before him, but when he learns that Teddy invited the whole family to the fundraiser and sees how friendly they all are with him, he gets upset. Even though Mitch reassures him that nothing is going on between him and Teddy anymore, Cam seems to not calm down. He only calms down when Jay tells him that although Teddy is a really good person and everyone likes him, he did not bring the best out of Mitch, something that Cam does.

Jay (Ed O'Neill), knowing that Claire (Julie Bowen) is looking for a job, offers her a position at his company. Claire though, having worked with him in the past and knowing how bad he can be as a boss, tries to avoid him so she will not have to tell him "no". Finally, not having any other choice, she confronts him and tells him that she can not work for him.

While the whole family is skating, Gloria (Sofía Vergara) sits on the bench because she does not know how to skate. When Phil (Ty Burrell) realizes that, he is willing to give her some skating lessons.

Haley (Sarah Hyland) and Alex (Ariel Winter) meet two boys, Max (Zack Roosa) and Blake (Zac Goodspeed), at the roller rink and they flirt with them. However, Alex is not very good at flirting, so Haley tries to give her some tips. Though they succeed in attracting the boys' attention, Alex is confused when Haley turns them down for both of them after the boys remark how "un-masculated" they feel after losing air hockey to girls. Haley tells Alex that teaching her to flirt was about helping her gain confidence that will attract boys who don't feel threatened when they lose to a girl.

Meanwhile, Manny (Rico Rodriguez) and Luke (Nolan Gould) have an essay assignment entitled "My Hero". They have to write about a member of their family who is a hero for them and why. Both boys are struggling with the subject because, for different reasons, they can not decide whom they should write about.

== Reception ==
=== Ratings ===
In its original American broadcast, "My Hero" was watched by 9.02 million; down 0.62 from the previous episode.

=== Reviews ===
"My Hero" received generally positive reviews.

Donna Bowman of The A.V. Club gave an A− grade to the episode saying that when all the characters of the show are gathered together in one place, good things happen. "In “My Hero,” almost everything MF can do right, it does right. And all this in the third episode from the end of the season, not a big showpiece of a finale or a holiday special. It's a reminder of how the right setting and structure can open up possibilities for simple, uncomplicated, well-crafted comedy."

Leigh Raines from TV Fanatic rated the episode with 4/5 saying that the best episodes are the ones who all the family is together.

Zack Dionne from Vulture rated the episode with 5/5.

Wyner C from Two Cents TV gave a good review to the episode saying that it was a "sweet little episode" and that the show is best when the family is together.

Michael Adams of 411mania gave the episode 7/10 saying that it was an alright episode, funny but predictable. "This episode did give us 2 possible season finale moments in Haley possibly going back to school, and Claire working with and inheriting Jay's company. If Claire is the bread-winner next season, and Phil is the stay at home dad, THAT will make for some good TV. Anyway, good episode, funny writing and moments, but it was nothing we haven't seen before on Modern Family."
