= Fulgencio (Modern Family) =

- Modern Family episode
- Episode no.: Season 4 Episode 13
- Directed by: Lev L. Spiro
- Written by: Bill Wrubel
- Production code: 4ARG12
- Original air date: January 23, 2013

Guest appearances
- Elizabeth Peña as Pilar; Stephanie Beatriz as Sonia; Reid Ewing as Dylan; Craig Zimmerman as Crispin; Josh Clark as Father Krzyzieski; John Kapelos as Stavros

Episode chronology
← Previous "Party Crasher"	Next → "A Slight at the Opera"
- Modern Family season 4

"Fulgencio" is the 13th episode of the fourth season of the American sitcom Modern Family, and the series' 85th episode overall. It aired January 23, 2013. The episode was written by Bill Wrubel and directed by Lev L. Spiro. The episode is noted for paying homage to the 1972 film The Godfather, with a sequence copying elements from a famous sequence in that film.

== Plot ==
The main story of this episode is the christening of Gloria (Sofia Vergara) and Jay's (Ed O'Neill) son. For the occasion, Gloria's mother, Pilar (Elizabeth Peña), and sister, Sonia (Stephanie Beatriz), come to visit bringing with them their Colombian traditions. Pilar wants her grandson to be given the family name Fulgencio, but Jay finds the name terrible and wants to call his new son Joe. When he tries to talk to Pilar, he discovers that she never liked him.

Meanwhile, with Claire (Julie Bowen) running around for errands, Phil (Ty Burrell) is alone at home with the kids and their problems plus his own one — a billboard with his face blocked by balloons. When the kids tell him what bothers them he tries to help. At first he tries to "kill" the problems with kindness but instead he makes things worse. When he realizes that being kind only helps sometimes, he follows another path. He has Luke (Nolan Gould) go around and cause trouble for the people causing problems for them by having him stay home while he and the others go to the christening, with Luke popping up during the baptismal vows, hinting at the fact that he has a devilish character like Satan.

Mitchell (Jesse Tyler Ferguson) and Cameron (Eric Stonestreet), on the other hand, are trying to deal with Lily's (Aubrey Anderson-Emmons) bad habit of making sarcastic comments. While trying that, they are wondering if they are bad parents since they are her role models. In the end, they find out that Lily's bad habits are coming from Claire when she drives her to her dance lessons.

The episode ends with the whole family at the christening of the newest member of the family. Finally, Jay goes with the name Fulgencio Joseph Pritchett to satisfy his mother-in-law, but he tells Gloria at the same time that they will never call him that. The godparents of the baby are Claire and Phil.

== Cultural references ==
The ending of the episode is similar to that of the 1972 film The Godfather. Specifically, when Phil recites the vows of renunciation during the Christening, the scene is intercut with scenes of his son Luke carrying out various acts of retaliation, on Phil's orders, against the people who are causing problems for his family: knocking a block out from under a trailer parked on a driveway so that the trailer rolls over a lemon tree off which Haley had earlier knocked a branch; using a BB gun to shoot the balloons that are blocking Phil's billboard; releasing rats at the party of a girl who had stolen Alex's birthday party theme; and placing the head of a stuffed zebra in the bed of a boy who was making fun of Luke at school and who had a fear of zebras.

This interpolation parallels the climactic scene in The Godfather, where Michael Corleone recites vows of renunciation during his godson's christening, while his Mafia enemies – including the dons of the rest of New York's Five Families – are killed on his order. The zebra head in the bed and the boy's response to it parallel an earlier scene in The Godfather where film studio president Jack Woltz has refused to do a favor for Vito Corleone by casting his godson Johnny Fontane, awakens to find the head of his prize racehorse in his bed and has a similar reaction. The final scene has Claire commenting on how odd it was that all of the problems had cleared up, to which Phil, sitting in his office, responds, "don't ask me about my business", after which Luke closes the office door, just as the final scene of The Godfather had Michael respond when his wife Kay had asked about the murder of Michael's brother-in-law Carlo Rizzi. In addition, Phil makes another reference earlier in the episode when he imitates Vito and refers to picking up the dry cleaning as "an offer I can't refuse".

== Reception ==
=== Ratings ===
In its original American broadcast, "Fulgencio" was watched by 10.83 million, down 0.18 from the previous episode.

=== Reviews ===
"Fulgencio" received positive reviews.

Kevin McFarland of The A.V. Club gave a B grade, saying: "What struck me most is that it abandoned the conventions of the documentary-style sitcom in favor of a heavier homage through editing. It's something that has happened in most episodes I’ve seen from the fourth season, and it’s a welcome addition to the show’s repertoire."

Michael Adams of 411mania rated the episode with 9/10, saying that it was another great episode: "Modern Family has come back from the hiatus strong, and hopefully they can keep that momentum going. I felt like this episode really showcased every character, especially the Dunphy kids. The homage that they paid to the Godfather was absolutely classic, and it's those small bits that this show does that make it so great."

Leigh Raines of TV Fanatic rated "Fulgencio" with a 4/5, saying that the episode was sweet, while Zach Dionne from Vulture gave the episode 3/5.

Cinephilactic of Bitch Stole My Remote gave a good review to the episode, saying that it was solid: "Modern Family continues its recent winning streak with another solid episode. What starts out as a rocky offensive ethnocentric stereotype manages to redeem itself thanks to a truly inspired homage."

Dalene Rovenstine of Paste rated the episode with 6.8/10, stating that the episode was steps back from the episode of last week (Party Crasher): "This episode might have felt less disappointing if it weren’t immediately following one of the best of this season (which is still a far cry from the best of the series)."
