= Career Day =

Career Day may refer to:

- "Career Day" (Modern Family), an episode of the television series Modern Family
- "Career Day" (That '70s Show), an episode of the television series That '70s Show
- "Career Day" (Invader Zim), an episode of the television series Invader Zim
- "Career Day" (Abbott Elementary), an episode of the television series Abbott Elementary
- "Career Days" (This Is Us), an episode of the television series This Is Us
- "Career Day", a song from the album Interventions + Lullabies by The Format
