= The Butler's Escape =

- Modern Family episode
- Episode no.: Season 4 Episode 4
- Directed by: Beth McCarthy-Miller
- Written by: Bill Wrubel
- Production code: 4ARG04
- Original air date: October 17, 2012

Episode chronology
← Previous "Snip"	Next → "Open House of Horrors"
- Modern Family season 4

"The Butler's Escape" is the fourth episode of the fourth season of the American sitcom Modern Family, and the series' 76th episode overall. It aired October 17, 2012. The episode was written by Bill Wrubel and directed by Beth McCarthy-Miller.

== Plot ==
Phil (Ty Burrell) can not accept that Luke (Nolan Gould) wants to quit magic and he tries everything to change his mind about it but it does not seem to work, including tasking Luke to complete a very tough magic trick to encourage him, which he does effortlessly. The real reason Phil does not like Luke's decision it is because that is the first time his son does not share the same interests with him and he is afraid he is losing him. At the end, he tells Luke that he can decide whatever he wants to do and he will support him.

In the absence of Haley (Sarah Hyland), Alex (Ariel Winter) takes on a high-handed role as the new big sister in the house. Claire (Julie Bowen) can not understand why her little daughter is acting like that the last few days and tries to figure out why and what is happening. Later she realizes that Alex's strange behavior is because she misses Haley.

Gloria's (Sofia Vergara) snoring keeps Jay (Ed O'Neill) and Manny (Rico Rodriguez) awake for days. They are both exhausted and try to find a way to get some sleep. Jay has a meeting in San Francisco and he takes the opportunity to sleep one night away from Gloria. The meeting ends up earlier than he thought, so he has to come back home. Instead of this, he goes to a hotel without telling Gloria that he is back. Gloria though finds out and she goes to the hotel thinking that Jay has an affair. Not having a choice, Jay tells Gloria the real reason he wants to sleep at the hotel.

Mitch (Jesse Tyler Ferguson) and Cam (Eric Stonestreet) struggle to deal with their reversed roles as Cam takes on his new job as a music teacher. Now that Cam is teaching again, Mitch has to do everything at the house, including taking care of Lily (Aubrey Anderson-Emmons). But he is not very successful, so he calls Claire to help him out. Meanwhile, the kids at school do not seem as excited as Cam is with teaching. Both Mitch and Cam seem to have a horrible day and they both agree that they just need time to adjust to the new reality.

== Reception ==
=== Ratings ===
In its original American broadcast, "The Butler's Escape" was watched by 12.28 million; down 0.03 from the previous episode.

=== Reviews ===
"The Butler's escape" received mixed reviews.

Donna Bowman of The A.V. Club gave a B− grade to the episode saying: "This season is off to a strong start, even if this week’s episode represents more of a holding action or slight backtrack than a confident step forward."

Leigh Raines of TV Fanatic rated "The Butler's Escape" with a 4/5 stating that Claire was literally everywhere on that episode. "Claire was on fire in this episode! She was schooling Jay, fixing things for Mitchell and setting up her daughters for the mutual destruction that would ultimately restore balance in her household. Her obsession with Gloria's weight actually cracks me up. At least she realizes her stepmom is super hot."

Mathew from Polentical gave a good review to the episode saying that it was "a fun escapist ride".

Britt Hayes of Screen Crush also gave a good review to the episode. "The role-reversal with Cam and Mitch has been an ongoing thing for a few weeks now, and here’s hoping they keep it up because if there’s anything more delightful than Cam and Mitch, it’s Cam and Mitch trying to do things they aren’t comfortable with and giving their relationship more depth as they help each other and bond."

Dalene Rovenstine of Paste Magazine rated the episode with 6.8/10. "It wasn’t a bad episode, but it wasn’t great. [...] All in all, as stated before, it wasn’t terrible, but we’ve definitely seen this show much stronger."

Michael Adams of 411mania rated the episode with 6.5/10. "There was just nothing spectacular about it. It had funny dialogue and moments, and the heart warming moment at the end (this week's was Phil and Luke) but there was nothing that made it different from any other par episode."

Denise Chang of No White Noise rated the episode with 2.5/4 saying that the episode was not as exciting and as memorable as she wanted it to be. "The main idea behind the story line is pretty much the same and this week’s funny moments didn’t do enough for me to consider it a twist on the same old story line. [...] It’s only the fourth episode of the season and I definitely can’t wait to see the characters grow even more throughout."

Shayelizatrotter from The Comedy Critic gave a C+ grade to the episode saying that it didn't meet her expectations. "I would have to say that this episode was rather weak overall and needed storylines with more physical humor and comedic one-liners."

Zach Dionne of Vulture rated the episode with only 1/5 saying: "This episode contained barely any elements the show does well, and highlighted almost all its dull and ugly facets."
