= When a Tree Falls =

- Modern Family episode
- Episode no.: Season 4 Episode 9
- Directed by: Steven Levitan
- Written by: Ben Karlin
- Production code: 4ARG09
- Original air date: November 28, 2012

Guest appearances
- Paul Scheer as Store manager; Drew Powell as Terry; Larry Herron as Terry's partner; Alex Fernandez as Park worker

Episode chronology
← Previous "Mistery Date"	Next → "Diamond in the Rough"
- Modern Family season 4

"When a Tree Falls" is the ninth episode of the fourth season of the American sitcom Modern Family, and the series' 81st episode overall. It aired November 28, 2012. The episode was written by Ben Karlin and directed by Steven Levitan.

In the episode, Cameron is upset about a tree that is going to get cut down and tries everything he can to prevent it from happening, including climbing on it. Mitchell tries to get him down but when Cameron has to leave after an emergency call, he is the one ending up on the tree. Jay and Phil accompany Manny and Luke to a kid's party where Jay tries to be funny in order to fit in with the crowd but ends up fighting with Phil after an embarrassing story he shared about him. Gloria and Claire go to the supermarket together and after a misunderstanding, they end up at the store's police office for stealing. To get them out of there, Gloria pretends she is in labor. Haley does her community service and Alex tries to take a bad picture of her to post on Facebook as revenge.

"When a Tree Falls" received positive reviews from the critics.

== Plot ==
An old tree is going to get cut down, and Cameron (Eric Stonestreet) is really upset about it since that tree means a lot to him. Deciding to save the tree, he gets there and climbs up it. Mitchell (Jesse Tyler Ferguson) is not thrilled with this idea, and he is trying to get him down, but when Cameron has to leave and go to the theater after an emergency call, Mitchell is the one who ends up sitting on the tree. At the end of the day, they manage to save the tree, and Cameron makes it in the newspaper.

Manny (Rico Rodriguez) and Luke (Nolan Gould) have to attend a kids' party where they play different games and have fun. Games are not in Manny's comfort zone. At the party are also the kids' parents, and Jay (Ed O'Neill) and Phil (Ty Burrell) are the ones who accompanied Manny and Luke. Jay, feeling that he does not belong there since he does not know anyone, tries to be funny by telling stories about Phil to make the other parents like him. Phil feels embarrassed, and when he and Jay have to compete against each other after a bet, Phil is very aggressive.

Gloria (Sofia Vergara) and Claire (Julie Bowen) decide to go together to the supermarket. Things do not go well, and they end up at the store's police office for stealing. Claire tries to explain that there was a misunderstanding and that she was not trying to steal anything, but she makes things worse. Gloria, seeing that there is no other way out of this, decides to pretend that she is in labor.

Meanwhile, after her arrest for underage drinking and assault, Haley (Sarah Hyland) has to do some community service. Alex (Ariel Winter) sees that as her opportunity for revenge against Haley for posting a bad picture of hers on Facebook in the past and embarrassing her. She goes to the place where Haley is working and tries to get an embarrassing picture of her. But things do not go the way she planned, as she loses her phone and gets covered in mud, and she is the one ending up on Facebook again.

== Reception ==
=== Ratings ===
In its original American broadcast, "When a Tree Falls" was watched by 12.01 million; up 0.12 from the previous episode.

=== Reviews ===
"When a Tree Falls" received positive reviews.

Donna Bowman of The A.V. Club gave a B+ grade to the episode and despite she didn't find it funny, she says that it deserves applause and respect. "No, not all that funny. But any show that can deliver this kind of undercover innovation, and without sacrificing its well-established personality, deserves both applause and respect."

Leigh Raines of TV Fanatic rated "When a Tree Falls" with a 4/5. "In the latest episode of Modern Family, I found out something that made me love Phil Dunphy even more than I already do. That's, right guys, in "When a Tree Falls" we found out that Phil once pulled a Lloyd Dobler."

Dalene Rovenstine of Paste Magazine rated the episode with 7.6/10 saying that Alex found her purpose again now that Haley is back home. "This week’s Modern Family episode, "When a Tree Falls", gave Alex purpose again. She just wasn’t the same without Haley around. Thank goodness she got kicked out of college."

Zach Dionne from Vulture rated the episode with 5/5 saying that it was not a momentous episode but an inspired one. "Not a momentous episode, but an inspired one. This didn't feel like lab-grown humor following an add-more-jokes-now-add-MORE-jokes algorithm; it felt like the show’s brains were on a first- or second-season buzz, barrelling through an episode and letting it be funny rather than forcing it to be."

Michael Adams from 411mania gave the episode 7/10 saying that it was not a bad episode. "They did a lot of things I liked in this episode. They expanded the relationships between Gloria & Claire and Jay & Phil, while at the same time showed different sides to those characters."
