= Open House of Horrors =

- Modern Family episode
- Episode no.: Season 4 Episode 5
- Directed by: James Bagdonas
- Written by: Elaine Ko
- Production code: 4ARG06
- Original air date: October 24, 2012

Guest appearances
- Colin Hanlon as Steven; Rodney To as Sam

Episode chronology
← Previous "The Butler's Escape"	Next → "Yard Sale"
- Modern Family season 4

"Open House of Horrors" is the fifth episode of the fourth season of the American sitcom Modern Family, and the series' 77th episode overall. It aired October 24, 2012. The episode was written by Elaine Ko and directed by James Bagdonas.

== Plot ==
After last year's extreme Halloween decorations and a trick that led to a man almost having a heart attack, the neighbors have asked Claire (Julie Bowen) to keep her celebration kid-friendly this year. Claire agrees to that but even though she keeps everything kid-friendly, none of the neighborhood kids come to her home for trick-or-treat because they are afraid.

Phil (Ty Burrell) decides to hold an open house on Halloween. Before leaving their house, he says to Claire that she is not scary. Claire takes that personally and decides to prove him wrong. She and the kids go to Phil’s open house and scare him.

Mitch (Jesse Tyler Ferguson) and Cam (Eric Stonestreet) throw a costume party and plan their costumes to show off Cam's new physique. However, there is a mistake on their costume order: Cam's matador costume comes in Mitch's size and Mitch's bull costume in Cam's size. Cam is worried that no one is going to notice that he lost weight in that costume.

Lily (Aubrey Anderson-Emmons) has an obsession with princesses and wants to dress as a princess for the second year in a row. Cam wonders where this is coming from. The reason is that a while ago Mitch told her that her mother is a princess. Mitch was hoping that Lily would forget about it but she did not and he is now trying to hide it from Cam since they agreed that one day they both would talk to her about her mom and tell her the truth. It doesn’t stay a secret for long, though, when Lily encounters a party guest dressed as a princess and brings up her mother. The family has a talk about it and everything is settled.

Manny (Rico Rodriguez) accidentally sets off the fire alarm at school, which leads everyone to miss the test and him to be sent to the principal's office. The cool kids of the class appreciate what he did and they thank him. Manny misjudges their behavior and agrees to hang out with them.

Gloria's (Sofia Vergara) hormones make her more quick-tempered than usual but she doesn't realize it. When Jay (Ed O'Neill) and Manny point that out, Jay tells her that it is because she is pregnant and that it is normal but she takes it as the baby is angry. Jay calms her down by saying that the baby is not angry and that she is going to be a great mother.

Simultaneously, when Jay can’t flirt his way out of a speeding ticket, he worries that he has lost his charm and is starting to look old. His confidence is boosted when the party guest in the princess costume- who, unbeknownst to Jay, is actually a man (Rodney To)- compliments his looks.

== Production ==
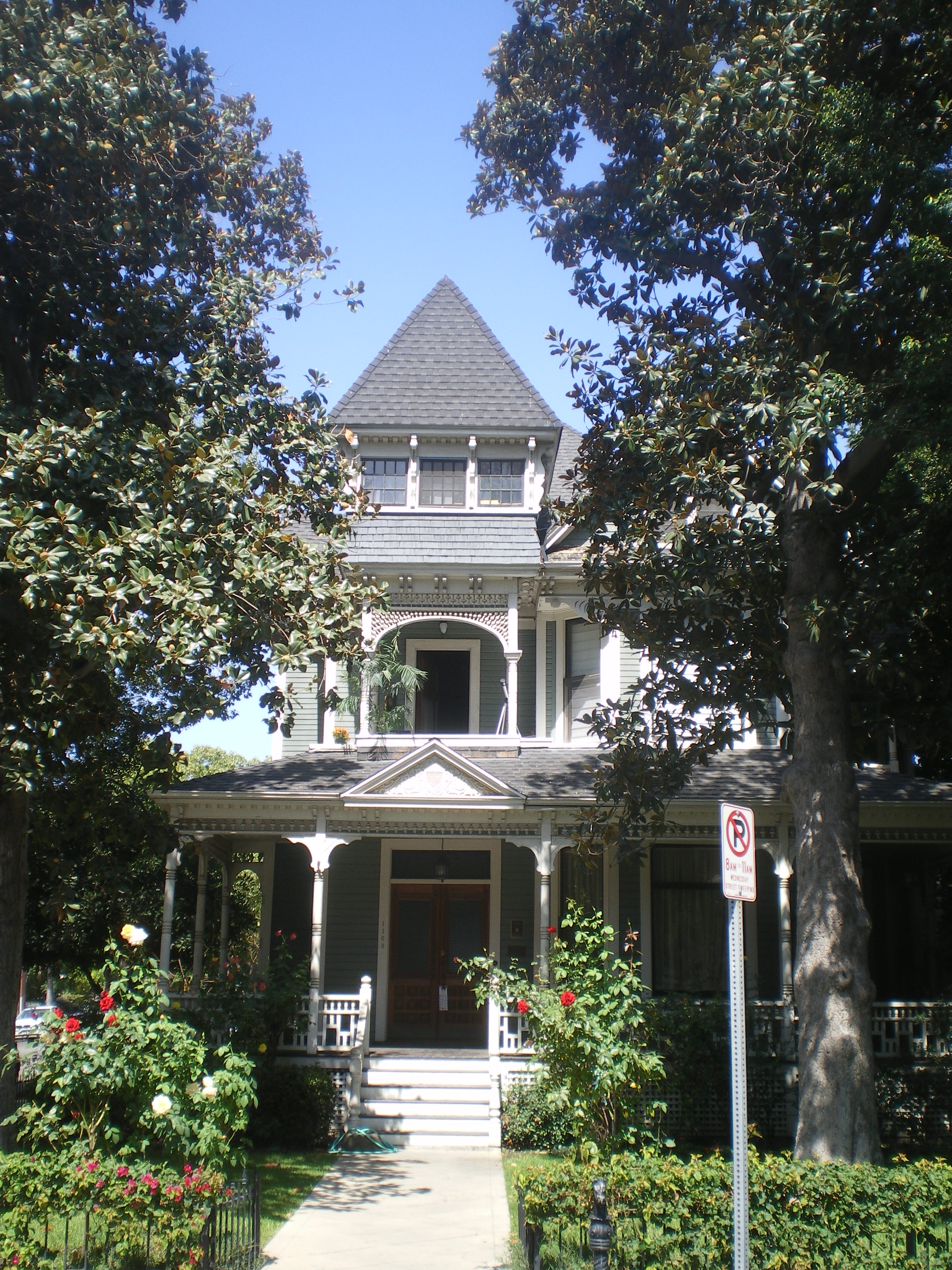
The historic Miller and Herriott House in Los Angeles was used as the exterior of the open house.

The open house's exterior was filmed at the Miller and Herriott House, while the interior was shot in the Holmes-Shannon House in Los Angeles.

== Reception ==
=== Ratings ===
In its original American broadcast, "Open House of Horrors" was watched by 12.52 million; up 0.24 from the previous episode.

=== Reviews ===
"Open House of Horrors" received positive reviews.

Donna Bowman of The A.V. Club gave a B grade to the episode saying: "One of the real pleasures of Halloween episodes throughout television history is how elaborate the costuming and decorations are. It’s like peeking into what Halloween could be if we all had access to special effects departments and unlimited wardrobe resources. And Claire’s exploding chest effect, enhanced with copious fake blood pouring out of her mouth, is astounding even by those elevated standards."

Leigh Raines of TV Fanatic rated "The Butler's Escape" with a 4/5 stating that this might not have been the best holiday episode for the characters but it still manage to get her laugh. "Not every holiday and not every Modern Family can be a slam dunk. "Open House of Horrors" wasn't the best Dunphy/Pritchett holiday, but it still managed to get in a few laughs."

Dalene Rovenstine of Paste Magazine rated the episode with 8/10. About the scene with Mitch, Cameron and Lily, where the two of them are trying to tell Lily the truth about her mother, she stated: "On a sitcom, telling a kid she’s adopted could go a number of different ways, but I think Modern Family did it right. I could imagine this conversation actually happening between parents and a child. It would have been easy to never address the issue (more jokes about the princess) or to try and be too comedic, but they took this moment to be real and honest. Props."

Michael Adams of 411mania rated the episode with 8/10. "...when it comes to this year's Halloween episode, it wasn't bad at all. It was definitely not better than its predecessor, but it's hard to beat the original. I liked that there was 3 different story lines for this episode instead of a big family episode; it gave each family more to do and the ability to highlight their own Halloween. All in all, the episode was worth the year long wait."

Wyner C from Two Cents TV gave a good review to the episode saying that it was a great Halloween episode.

Denise Chang of No White Noise rated the episode with 3/4 saying that the episode "was fairly good but not spectacular. It didn’t quite live up to its full potential but got a good few laughs out of me here and there."

Pollysgotyournumbers of Bitch Stole My Remote gave a good review to the episode stating: "So, I’m just gonna go ahead and call it: this was 2012′s best Hallowe’en themed television show. Was anyone else genuinely scared of Claire’s Beetlejuice-laden plot to show Phil just how scary she can be? Just me? Oh, okay."

Shayelizatrotter from The Comedy Critic gave the episode a B− rate saying that overall the episode was "not necessarily as thrilling as previous Halloween episodes, this year’s was still memorable."
