= The Wow Factor =

- Modern Family episode
- Episode no.: Season 4 Episode 18
- Directed by: Steven Levitan
- Written by: Ben Karlin
- Production code: 4ARG17
- Original air date: March 27, 2013

Guest appearances
- Wendi McLendon-Covey as Pam; Margaret Easley as Rachel; Fred Willard as Frank Dunphy

Episode chronology
| ← Previous "Best Men" | Next → "The Future Dunphys" |
- Modern Family season 4

"The Wow Factor" is the 18th episode of the fourth season of the American sitcom Modern Family, and the series' 90th episode overall. Modern Family is an American television mockumentary family sitcom created by Christopher Lloyd and Steven Levitan for the American Broadcasting Company. It ran for eleven seasons, from September 23, 2009 to April 8, 2020. It follows the lives of Jay Pritchett and his family in suburban Los Angeles, including his second wife, her son (his stepson), their son, and his two adult children and their husbands and children. It was aired on March 27, 2013. The episode was written by Ben Karlin and directed by Levitan.

Jesse Tyler Ferguson submitted this episode for consideration due to his nomination for the Primetime Emmy Award for Outstanding Supporting Actor in a Comedy Series at the 65th Primetime Emmy Awards. Ferguson also named this episode as his favorite one of the fourth season.

== Plot ==
Cam (Eric Stonestreet) and Claire (Julie Bowen) work together on the renovation of a house they intend to flip later, but they seem to disagree on many things. A disagreement on their respective visions of the backyard makes Cam call his lesbian friend, Pam (Wendi McLendon-Covey), whose son attends the same school as Lily (Aubrey Anderson-Emmons), to tell them what she thinks since she is working on the constructions with the intent to make her side with Cam. This backfires when Claire charms Pam with her physique, swaying Pam in her favor. Nevertheless, Cam still goes ahead and makes the fountain he wanted on his own. Claire and Pam accept the feature but soon change their minds after goldfish in the fountain get sucked into the pump and are killed.

Mitchell (Jesse Tyler Ferguson) drops off Lily at school, when he sees that there is a playground bully named Milo (Luke Grakal) who is being unfair to the other kids. His first attempt to teach him a lesson is to compete against him in a match of handball, which failed because of Mitch's lack of skill; he then asks for Luke's (Nolan Gould) help. He ultimately wins the second time around, but his victory is frowned upon by parents watching the match and he ends up receiving complaints.

Meanwhile, Jay (Ed O'Neill) encourages Gloria (Sofia Vergara) to spend some time with Manny (Rico Rodriguez) since both of them feels like she is ignoring him lately because of Joe, her newborn baby; thus, the two of them strike a deal: Jay spends time with Joe (in order to avoid having to go to a four-hour Moby Dick reading with Manny) and Gloria, with Manny. On his way to the baby class, he encounters an old high school friend of Claire's, Rachel (Margaret Easley), and after a little talk, Jay decides to skip the baby class and go to the movies with the baby. However, Joe starts crying during the movie and Rachel offers to take him outside until the movie ends. When Gloria sees her baby with a stranger, she berates him for it, but it is soon revealed that she pretended to misunderstand some English so as to also not have to listen to Moby Dick. In the end, Manny and Jay read Moby Dick together.

At the Dunphy's house, Phil (Ty Burrell) tries to teach Alex (Ariel Winter) and Haley (Sarah Hyland) a few basic things about home management improvement. Attempting to explain them how the water heater works, he breaks it. Seeing that he cannot fix it, he asks the girls to go to the store to buy him a screwdriver so that he can call his dad (Fred Willard) to tell him what to do while being alone.

== Reception ==
=== Ratings ===
In its original American broadcast, "The Wow Factor" was watched by 9.09 million; down 1.44 from the previous episode.

=== Reviews ===
"The Wow Factor" received generally positive reviews.

Donna Bowman of The A.V. Club gave a B+ grade to the episode saying that the structure of the episode is conventional but the way the script gets around to its key setpieces is appreciable. "Last time Karlin gave us a Modern Family script, the overall structure was the gem. Here, it’s the little moments that elevate what’s around them to something out of the ordinary."

Dalene Rovenstine from Paste Magazine rated the episode with 8.8/10 but stated that the writers wasted the talent of Wendi McLendon-Covey by not given her many lines.

Michael Adams of 411mania gave the episode 8/10 saying that this episode did what it needed to do. "I liked tonight, thought it was pretty funny and am happy that they brought back the house flip. Keep things as funny as tonight, if not funnier, tie in some story arcs from this past season, give me Jay's birthday or a vacation, and end the season on a high note."

Leigh Raines from TV Fanatic and Zach Dionne from the Vulture, both rated the episode with 4/5 with the latter saying that the episode is a "winner".

Wyner C of Two Cents TV also gave a good review saying that the episode was "cute".
