= Bad Hair Day (Modern Family) =

- Modern Family episode
- Episode no.: Season 4 Episode 16
- Directed by: Gail Mancuso
- Written by: Elaine Ko
- Production code: 4ARG16
- Original air date: February 20, 2013

Guest appearances
- Maxwell Caulfield as Professor Cooke; David Faustino as Tater; Annie Mumolo as Esther; Maribeth Monroe as Maggie

Episode chronology
| ← Previous "Heart Broken" | Next → "Best Men" |
- Modern Family season 4

"Bad Hair Day" is the 16th episode of the fourth season of the American sitcom Modern Family, and the series' 88th episode overall. It aired February 20, 2013. The episode was written by Elaine Ko and directed by Gail Mancuso.

== Plot ==
Claire (Julie Bowen) has her college reunion and she is glad that Phil (Ty Burrell) can not go with her because there will be many things he does not know and to try to explain him everything all the time can be really annoying. Her ex-boyfriend, a professor (Maxwell Caulfield) she dated 20 years ago, will also be there, another reason she does not want Phil to be there. When Phil's plans for bowling get cancelled and he surprises her by showing up without telling her, things get awkward.

Jay (Ed O'Neill) has a bowling tournament and he is determined to win. Having his plans for the day, he leaves Gloria (Sofia Vergara) alone with the baby and running around for errands. When Mitchell (Jesse Tyler Ferguson) comes to her house to ask her lend him a boa, she slips and hurts her ankle. Mitchell feels bad and offers to take little Joe for the day. Gloria accepts his offer and takes advantage of the opportunity to go for a free spa day.

In the Tucker-Pritchett house, Cameron (Eric Stonestreet) has one of his elaborate photo shoots. When Lily (Aubrey Anderson-Emmons) gets bored and quits, Cam can not waste the opportunity to use Joe. A wig malfunction though—Lily glued the wig to Joe's hair—leads the two men to cut off Joe's hair and of course no one wants to tell Gloria because they all know how she will react. Finally, Jay is the one who ends up telling her and takes the blame, but surprisingly, Gloria reacts very well.

== Reception ==
=== Ratings ===
In its original American broadcast, "Bad Hair Day" was watched by 10.62 million, up 0.57 from the previous episode.

=== Reviews ===
"Bad Hair Day" received positive reviews.

Emily St. James of The A.V. Club gave a B grade to the episode saying that the series reminded her most of The Cosby Show and even if it doesn't produce A or A− episodes anymore, it still doesn't produce an episode that deserves less than a B− by playing it safe. "I think it's important to note just how hard it is to create a show that plays it safe but is still mostly satisfying."

Victoria Leigh Miller from Yahoo! TV stated that the show missed a major opportunity on the episode since it had as guest David Faustino but the writers didn't write a scene of him with Ed O'Neill. "The Season 4 episode "Bad Hair Day" had all of the ingredients to be one of the great ones: smart one-liners, physical comedy, and a classic TV guest star. But why, oh why would you bring in Ed O'Neill's former "Married With Children" TV son David Faustino and not have them do a scene together?"

Leigh Raines from TV Fanatic rated the episode a 4/5 while Zach Dionne from Vulture rated it with 5/5.
