= Party Crasher (Modern Family) =

- Modern Family episode
- Episode no.: Season 4 Episode 12
- Directed by: Fred Savage
- Written by: Danny Zuker; Christopher Lloyd
- Production code: 4ARG10
- Original air date: January 16, 2013

Guest appearance
- Jason Mantzoukas as Kenny

Episode chronology
← Previous "New Year's Eve"	Next → "Fulgencio"
- Modern Family season 4

"Party Crasher" is the 12th episode of the fourth season of the American sitcom Modern Family, and the series' 84th episode overall. It aired January 16, 2013. The episode was written by Danny Zuker & Christopher Lloyd and directed by Fred Savage. This episode is when Gloria's (Manny's mother and Jay's wife) water breaks and has a baby on Manny's birthday.

== Plot ==
Gloria (Sofia Vergara) and Jay (Ed O'Neill) try to plan a surprise birthday party for Manny (Rico Rodriguez) since it is his 14th birthday and also because it is the last birthday they are going to be just the three of them. While they are out of the house trying to get a cake, the rest of the family is at their home setting up the party. Manny, thinking that no one will be home, comes home with his new girlfriend (Krystal Gauvin), who kisses him as a birthday gift, oblivious to the fact that everyone is watching them in the dark. The girl feels embarrassed and runs away, and Manny locks himself in his room. Jay finally persuades him to come out and enjoy his party, only for Gloria's water to break when he does. She tries to not give birth until after midnight, so Manny won't have to share his birthday. Manny tells her he appreciates the thought, but he doesn't mind. Gloria then gives birth to a boy, who the family welcomes.

Cam (Eric Stonestreet) feels he has neglected Lily (Aubrey Anderson-Emmons) lately with his commitment to work which Mitchell (Jesse Tyler Ferguson) misinterprets as his job not going well. In the meantime, Lily has asked Mitchell to marry her, and that makes Cam think that Lily does not love him anymore. This is not helped when, during the course of the episode, he is indirectly responsible for injuring Lily more than once.

Meanwhile, Haley (Sarah Hyland) starts a flirtation with a much older co-worker named Kenny (Jason Mantzoukas), wanting to get a rise out of her parents. Claire (Julie Bowen) does not like it at all, while Phil (Ty Burrell) takes a while to realize that they are not just friends. In the process, he takes it extremely worse than Claire, who remembers that when she was at Haley's age, she started dating an older guy to get a rise out of her dad, and she realizes that Haley is doing the same. So, she convinces Phil to ignore it and not say anything because the more they show it bothers them, the longer Haley is going to stay with him. In the end, Haley breaks character and, after overhearing Phil at the hospital, rushes to hug him.

== Reception ==
=== Ratings ===
In its original American broadcast, "Party Crasher" was watched by 11.01 million; down 1.03 from the previous episode.

=== Reviews ===
"Party Crasher" received positive reviews.

Phil Dyess-Nugent of The A.V. Club gave a B− grade saying that the three interlocking family units remained stable since the show is on air for four years now but Gloria giving birth to a new baby is a big change for the whole show. "The show itself trades in the commonplace that the modern definition of "family" is in flux, but these families haven't had to weather any major changes until tonight, when —tada!— Gloria has her baby."

Leigh Raines of TV Fanatic rated "Party Crasher" with a 4.5/5 saying that this kind of Modern Family episode had been her favorite."This was my favorite kind of Modern Family episode. Things go from laughs to feeling tears prick at your eyes and little goosebumps of emotion. So happy to have a new addition to the family!"

Zach Dionne from Vulture rated the episode with 5/5 saying that the episode was great. "Gloria has the baby and it’s not an episode-dominator or draw-too-many-times-from-the-cliché-well-er. This one brims most beautifully with sentiment that feels true, slapstick that works (entirely at Lily’s expense), and writing that glimmers like chrome. Barely a line feels wasted."

Dalene Rovenstine of Paste Magazine rated the episode with 9.2/10 stating that Modern Family might didn't break ground with this episode, but it did what it used to succeed at so well. "A baby, a surprise birthday party, Manny’s first kiss, and references to "Stacy’s Mom" and Mrs. Robinson? "Party Crasher" was a packed-full half-hour that delivered touching family moments and heartfelt humor."

Michael Adams of 411mania gave the episode 9/10. "I liked this episode. I liked the separate family story lines, as well as the final moment where they all got to meet the new family member, and were confused about their relationship towards the baby."

Wyner C of Two Cents TV gave a good review to the episode saying: "I thought this episode killed it. I loved the touching moments and the funny ones. It was well balanced. Gloria gave birth but instead of making it the “main” event, it was just an event for the family – like in real life."
