= A Slight at the Opera =

- Modern Family episode
- Episode no.: Season 4 Episode 14
- Directed by: James Bagdonas
- Written by: Paul Corrigan; Brad Walsh
- Production code: 4ARG14
- Original air date: February 6, 2013

Guest appearances
- Nathan Lane as Pepper Saltzman; Reid Ewing as Dylan; Norma Maldonado as Psychic; Fred Willard as Frank Dunphy

Episode chronology
← Previous "Fulgencio"	Next → "Heart Broken"
- Modern Family season 4

"A Slight at the Opera" is the 14th episode of the fourth season of the American sitcom Modern Family, and the series' 86th episode overall. It aired February 6, 2013. The episode was written by Paul Corrigan & Brad Walsh and directed by James Bagdonas. For his performance in the episode, Nathan Lane received a nomination for the Primetime Emmy Award for Outstanding Guest Actor in a Comedy Series.

== Plot ==
Cameron (Eric Stonestreet) puts on a school production of the "Phantom of the Opera", but when their main star falls ill, Manny (Rico Rodriguez) pulls out all the stops to land the lead part. When Cameron hears Luke (Nolan Gould) singing, he wants him to take the lead. Manny convinces Cam to let him talk to Luke in order to terrify him so that he can get the lead. Later, when Cameron asks Manny to hear Luke singing so that he can improve his, Manny understands that he is not the person for the role and lets Luke take the leading part of the play.

Cam has Gloria (Sofia Vergara) running errands for the play, and she takes Alex (Ariel Winter) with her for help. Since they have some time to kill, Gloria takes Alex to her psychic (Norma Maldonado). Alex, who does not believe in psychics, pretends to validate the psychic's claims, although they are false. She intends to tell Gloria that her psychic is fake, but in the end changes her mind when a boy fitting the psychic's description as her new boyfriend sits next to her at Cam's play.

Meanwhile, Phil (Ty Burrell) decides that learning how to golf is necessary for his business and Jay (Ed O'Neill) agrees to teach him. While they are golfing, Mitchell (Jesse Tyler Ferguson) gets there with his friend Pepper (Nathan Lane). Mitch tells his dad that he has been practicing for a while now, and the four of them end up playing a game; Jay and Phil against Mitch and Pepper.

With Cam in school, Mitch and Jay golfing and Gloria out, Claire (Julie Bowen) stays home to watch over Lily (Aubrey Anderson-Emmons) and little Joe. When she slips on one of the golf balls Phil left on the floor, she wants to teach him that leaving things around is not a good thing. While Claire is busy trying to stage an accident, Haley (Sarah Hyland) and Dylan (Reid Ewing) end up being the ones watching the two kids. This led to her thinking that raising a family is easy, and she asks Dylan to give her a baby. This terrifies Claire, who switches from staging an accident to waking up the baby, as she believes that after seeing the baby cry, Haley would change her mind. However, Dylan left after Haley and him had a fight, just before Claire set off the fire alarm and woke up the baby.

The episode ends with the school play for which Luke's grandfather (Fred Willard) flew from Florida just to see him, even if he was just painting a wall. No one knows that Luke got the lead part. Phil and Claire are surprised and moved when they see him on stage singing.

== Reception ==
=== Ratings ===
In its original American broadcast, "A Slight at the Opera" was watched by 9.83 million; down 1 from the previous episode.

=== Reviews ===
"A Slight at the Opera" received mostly positive reviews.

Claire Zulkey of The A.V. Club gave a B+ grade. "What's most important is that Modern Family can still pull out strong episodes, so long as the writing is solid and the show can avoid falling into its own clichés. [...] the writing made the episode. Were Haley, Alex or Claire really relevant? Not really, but the show can still pull off a pretty funny installment without giving everyone a great storyline, so long as the jokes are silly, strange and rapid-fire."

Leigh Raines of TV Fanatic gave the episode 4/5 praising Lane's guest appearance. "Golf isn't exactly my cup of tea, but Lane manages to jazz up any scene he's in."

Dalene Rovenstine of Paste Magazine rated the episode with 8.7/10 stating that the episode was solid and she was pleasantly surprised after last week's let down. "There were great one-off lines, the storylines were accurately balanced, and the episode as a whole was understated but solid."

Michael Adams of 411mania gave the episode 8.5/10 saying that this episode was very funny and creative. "I think what I loved the most about this episode, outside of the previously mentioned parts, was that Dylan was present and strong. Dylan is like Bruce Wayne/Batman. He's there and your enjoying him, and then he vanishes out of nowhere! [...] Use that kid more often Modern Family."

Victoria Leigh Miller from Yahoo! TV found the episode slightly familiar but in the right way. "School plays, a wacky babysitting adventure, a psychic pit stop, and a retro revisit to a sad song? This "Modern Family" episode was slightly familiar, but in all the right ways."

Zach Dionne from Vulture gave the episode 3/5 saying that this week was "...harmless and not hilarious. Good enough."
