= Stark Raving Mad (TV series) =

- Genre: Sitcom
- Created by: Steven Levitan
- Starring: Tony Shalhoub; Neil Patrick Harris; Eddie McClintock; Heather Paige Kent; Dorie Barton
- Composers: Steve Hampton; Korban Kraus; John Adair
- Country of origin: United States
- Original language: English
- No. of seasons: 1
- No. of episodes: 22 (4 unaired)

Production
- Executive producers: Steven Levitan; Jeffrey Richman; Alan Kirschenbaum
- Producers: Pamela Grant; Richard Levine
- Camera setup: Multi-camera
- Running time: 30 minutes
- Production companies: Steven Levitan Productions; 20th Century Fox Television

Original release
- Network: NBC
- Release: September 23, 1999 – July 13, 2000

Stark Raving Mad is an American sitcom television series that aired on NBC from September 23, 1999, to July 13, 2000. The series starred Tony Shalhoub and Neil Patrick Harris.

== Synopsis ==
Shalhoub stars as odd horror novelist Ian Stark, who is obsessed with practical jokes, and whose first book Below Ground was a best seller. Neil Patrick Harris is Stark's reluctant editor Henry McNeeley, who has a variety of phobias and possibly obsessive–compulsive disorder.

== Production ==
On January 10, 2000, the sitcom won a People's Choice Award for Favorite New Television Comedy Series. The sitcom premiered on September 23, 1999, and was officially cancelled by NBC on April 15, 2000, despite being ranked 19th among all programs with an average of 15.5 million viewers, as it held poor retention rates from its lead-in, Frasier, and was consistently beaten by Who Wants to Be a Millionaire? in the same timeslot.

== Cast ==
=== Main ===
- Tony Shalhoub as Ian Stark
- Neil Patrick Harris as Henry McNeeley
- Eddie McClintock as Jake Donovan
- Dorie Barton as Tess Farraday
- Heather Paige Kent as Margaret 'Maddie' Keller (this role was originally to be played by Jessica Cauffiel who appeared in several early cast photos)

=== Recurring and guest stars ===
- Harriet Sansom Harris as Audrey
- Chris Sarandon as Cesar
- Dina Waters as Katherine 'Kit' Yate
- Kellie Waymire as the other Tess, Tess Farraday's co-worker in the museum

== Episodes ==
No.	Title	Directed by	Written by	Original release date	Prod. code	Viewers (millions)
1	"Pilot"	James Burrows	Steven Levitan	September 23, 1999	1ADM79	18.62
Henry McNeely gets a promotion he doesn't want. He's now the editor for the eccentric horror novelist Ian Stark. Ian's practical jokes are done at the expense of Henry.
2	"The Man Who Knew Too Much"	Ted Wass	Alan Kirschenbaum	September 30, 1999	1ADM01	19.52
Trying to pull another joke on Henry, Ian learns things he did not want to know about Henry's girlfriend.
3	"Sometimes a Fritter Is Just a Fritter"	Ted Wass	David A. Goodman	October 7, 1999	1ADM03	17.58
Henry's misunderstanding of a change of a name of a character in Ian's manuscript ruins Ian's morning routine of fritters and long walks.
4	"Four Colds and a Funeral"	Gail Mancuso	Eric Zicklin	October 14, 1999	1ADM05	17.03
Henry accidentally kills a man named Professor Huggles (a character obviously inspired by Dr. Seuss)
5	"The Lyin' King"	Gail Mancuso	Brian Buckner & Sebastian Jones	October 21, 1999	1ADM06	18.38
During Halloween, Ian helps Henry to pay back his cousin Lori for an old prank she pulled on him, while Maddie's date may or may not be a humpback for real.
6	"Fish out of Water"	Ted Wass	Jeffrey Richman	November 4, 1999	1ADM04	16.17
Everyone is at Audrey's dinner party where a fish needs to be put back into the tank.
7	"Engaged to Be Engaged"	Gail Mancuso	Gayle Abrams	November 11, 1999	1ADM07	15.04
Henry tries to make a commitment to Tess.
8	"The Stalker"	Ken Levine	Steven Levitan	November 18, 1999	1ADM09	15.23
Ian's obsessed fan wants to take Henry's place.
9	"The Dance"	Gail Mancuso	Steven Levitan	December 2, 1999	1ADM08	14.71
Tess attempts to fix up Ian and Maddie.
10	"Coffin to Go"	Ted Wass	Lynnie Greene & Richard Levine	December 9, 1999	1ADM02	16.99
Ian discovers that the funeral place accidentally sold him a coffin with a corpse in it.
11	"Christmas Cheerleader"	Michael Lembeck	David A. Goodman	December 16, 1999	1ADM10	20.85
Tess tries to cheer up Christmas for a bunch of social outcasts.
12	"The Crush"	Michael Lembeck	Eric Zicklin	January 6, 2000	1ADM11	18.80
Ian has a crush on a woman, but Jake cannot be trusted with letters.
13	"My Bodyguard (a.k.a. Guarding Tess)"	Steven Levitan	Gayle Adams	January 13, 2000	1ADM12	15.79
Henry, Ian and Tess get mugged. Ian head-butts the mugger and saves the day. Henry soon feels sexually inadequate when he learns that Ian's heroics caused Tess to have an erotic dream about Ian. Ian sets up a similar incident, designed to make Henry look like a hero in Tess' eyes.
14	"The Hypnotist"	Michael Lembeck	Alan Kirschenbaum	February 3, 2000	1ADM15	15.58
Ian professes to be a hypnotic expert and the situation gets out of hand. Note: Ian claims to have once suffered from OCD, but cured it with hypnosis. Tony Shalhoub would later find success in Monk, playing a detective with OCD.
15	"Therapy"	Sheldon Epps	Eric Zicklin	March 2, 2000	1ADM16	12.91
Ian and Henry go to a therapist. After the session Henry wants to know what the therapist told about him. Ian lies that she thinks Henry is paranoid.
16	"Secrets and Lies"	David Lee	Jeffrey Richman	March 9, 2000	1ADM18	11.66
A Yale student turns up some shocking secrets about where Ian was nearly twenty years ago.
17	"The Grade"	Steven Levitan	Brian Buckner & Sebastian Jones	March 16, 2000	1ADM21	12.55
Ian helps Maddie by writing a book report for her, but then is furious when her professor only gives her a "B".
18	"The Pigeon"	Sheldon Epps	Joe Piscatella & Craig A. Williams	July 13, 2000	1ADM17	6.68
Ian accidentally knocks a pigeon's nest filled with eggs off his balcony's ledge. Later he becomes paranoid, thinking the mother pigeon is back with vengeance.
19	"He's Gotta Have It"	Joyce Gittlin	Lynnie Greene & Richard Levine	Unaired	1ADM13	N/A
Tess' sister visits and Ian becomes uncontrollably attracted to her.
20	"Dog Gone"	Gail Mancuso	Brian Buckner & Sebastian Jones	Unaired	1ADM14	N/A
Henry loses Edgar, and when he finds him, new problems arise.
21	"The Psychic"	Jeff Melman	Dana Gould	Unaired	1ADM19	N/A
The gang gets their fortunes read.
22	"The Big Finish"	Robert Egan	Richard Levine & Lynnie Greene	Unaired	1ADM20	N/A
Henry tries to retrieve Ian's latest manuscript.

== International airings ==
In some countries the series was renamed: Loco enloquecido (Latin America), Stark, loco de atar (Spain), Splitter Pine Gal (Norway), Kreisi kynäniekka (Finland) and "En förläggares mardröm" (Sweden).
