= Larry Sullivan =

American actor (born 1970)

- Born: Lawrence Edward Sullivan, Jr. September 10, 1970 (age 56); New Haven, Connecticut, U.S.
- Occupation: Actor
- Years active: 1990–present
- Spouse: David Monahan
- Children: 1

Lawrence Edward Sullivan, Jr. (born September 10, 1970) is an American actor. Among his prominent roles is that of Robert, Will's ballet dancing boyfriend, on the NBC television series Will & Grace. The episode was the show's first ever holiday episode, titled "Jingle Balls." Sullivan frequently appears as Officer Andy Akers on the CBS television series CSI: Crime Scene Investigation. Sullivan appeared in 3 episodes of 24 as Secret Service Agent Hoskins. His latest work includes a guest appearance on Modern Family as Mitchell's ex-boyfriend in the episode "My Hero" and a recurring role in the first season of the HBO series Big Little Lies.

== Life and career ==
Sullivan was born in New Haven, Connecticut on September 10, 1970, to Lawrence and Sheryl Sullivan.

Sullivan was a member of the First National Tour of the Broadway Musical Miss Saigon, and starred in the West Coast Premiere of Hello Again by Michael John LaChiusa at Noah Wyle's The Blank Theatre Company in Hollywood, California. Sullivan played the leading role of Alan Oakley in The Trip, for which role he won Best Actor at the Dallas OUT TAKES Film Festival.

Sullivan's husband is actor David Monahan; they have one adopted child together. The family was featured in a Campbell's Soup commercial in 2015.

== Filmography ==
Year	Title	Role	Notes
1990	Dream Trap	—N/a	Uncredited
1990	The Night Brings Charlie		Uncredited
1997	Defying Gravity Otter	Otter	as Larry Sullivan Jr.
1998	Cosmo's Tale	—N/a	
1999	Love, Death, & Cars	Kyle	Short
2001	Forbidden City	Randy	Short
2002	The Trip	Alan Oakley	
2004	Catwoman	Warehouse Supervisor	
2005	Bewitched	Dinner Party Guest	Uncredited
2005	A.M.D.G.: A World Is Not Enough	Peter Faber	Short
2006	Inside	Fred	
2006	Kalamazoo?	Nate	
2007	Fracture	Lee Gardner	
2007	Evan Almighty	Staffer	
2008	Pretty Ugly People	Austin	
2010	Gay Baby	Bryan	Short
2010	Miss Nobody	2nd Man	
2010	Open House	Oscar	
2012	Argo	Engell's Secretary	
2012	Divorce Invitation	Brad Tuston	
2013	Nightcomer	Paul Beecher	
2013	Crawlspace	Police Officer J. Forester	
2015	Straight Outta Compton	Journalist	
2017	Aftermath	James Gullick	
2019	American Skin	Clay Dwyer	

== Television ==
Year	Title	Role	Notes
1996-1998	Beverly Hills, 90210	Bernie Torgov / Larry	as Larry Sullivan Jr.
1997	Sunset Beach	Gabe	Uncredited
1997	Sweet Valley High		
1997	The Young and the Restless	Orderly Dylan Wordsworth	
1998	Rush Hour	Cop at Diner #2	as Larry Sullivan Jr.
1998	Hang Time	Corn Dog Boss	as Larry Sullivan Jr.
1998	Hyperion Bay	Todd	as Larry Sullivan Jr.
1998	USA High	Kevin	as Larry Sullivan Jr.
1999	Suddenly Susan	Daniel	as Larry Sullivan Jr.
1999	Felicity	Preston	as Lawrence Edward Sullivan Jr.
1999	Hefner: Unauthorized	Tom Lownes	TV movie
2000	Psycho Beach Party Dancer	Dancer	as Larry Sullivan Jr.
2000	The West Wing	Hamlin	Episode: "Take Out the Trash Day"
2000	Diagnosis Murder	Jordon Alsop	Episode: "Teacher's Pet"
2000	JAG	CPO Roger Pearson	Episode: "Promises"
2000	Battle of the Sitcoms	Jon Splitt	
2001	These Old Broads	Jason	TV movie
2001	Will & Grace	Robert	Episode: "Jingle Balls"
2003	Six Feet Under	Deputy Wheeler	2 episodes
2003	NCIS	Flight Surgeon	Episode: "High Seas"
2003-2014:	CSI: Crime Scene Investigation	Officer Andy Akers	43 episodes
2004	American Dreams	Russ	Episode: ""
2004	The Shield	Det. Craig Milne	Episode: "What Power Is..."; Episode: "Strays" (voice, uncredited)
2004	ER	Martin Pryor	Episode: "Drive"
2004	Method & Red	Blue Squad Guy	Uncredited
2005	Alias	Phil	Episode: "Welcome to Liberty Village"
2005	Jack & Bobby	Officer Kohler	Episode: "Stand by Me"
2005	Over There	Dr. Beatty	Episode: "Embedded"
2005	Nip/Tuck	Detective Myers	Episode: "Granville Trapp"
2005	Crossing Jordan	George Winters	Episode: "Enlightenment"
2006	E-Ring	Army Staff Sgt. Michaels	Episode: "War Crimes"
2006	Twins	Stu Siden	Episode: "Housing Crisis"
2006	Big Love	Trooper	Episode: "Eclipse"
2006	The Unit	Avner	Episode: "Unannounced"
2006	Commander in Chief	Dan Pierce	4 episodes
2006	Zoey 101	Mr. Conroy	Episode: "The Silver Hammer Society"
2007	Close to Home	Nick Tursi	Episode: "Getting In"
2007	Criminal Minds	Sheriff Raymond Schaeffer	Episode: "Open Season"
2008	Women's Murder Club	Inspector Ted Wheeler	Uncredited
2008	Dexter	Ethan Turner	Episode: "Turning Biminese"
2009	Grey's Anatomy	Dave Young	Episode: "Stand by Me"
2009	The Secret Life of the American Teenager	Leon	4 episodes
2009	Saving Grace	Donald Jacobs	Episode: "What Would You Do?"
2009	Trauma	Matt - Divorced Dad	Episode: "Masquerade"
2009	Turbo Dates	Gary	Episode: "Emotional Baggage"
2009	24	Agent Hoskins	3 episodes (2009-10)
2010	Scrubs	Eric Coleman	Episode: "Our Thanks"
2010	Private Practice	Bob Schwartz	Episode: "All in the Family"
2011	CSI: Miami	Edwin Chambers	Episode: "Crowned"
2012	Game Change	Chris Edwards	TV movie
2012	Castle	Samuel Lynchberg	Episode: "A Dance with Death"
2013-2014	Switched at Birth	Leo	3 episodes
2013	Modern Family	Teddy	Episode: "My Hero"
2013	Revenge	Dr. Norton	Episode: "Truth: Part 2"
2013	Body of Proof	David Hunt	2 episodes
2013	Days of Our Lives	George Durant	11 episodes
2014	The Crazy Ones	Garrett	Episode: "Outbreak"
2014	Bones	Dr. Richard Burke	Episode: "The High in the Low"
2017	Doubt	ADA Asher Lowman	2 episodes
2017	Scandal	Nelson McClintock	3 episodes
2017	S.W.A.T.	Robert Miller	Episode: "Pamilya"
2017, 2019	Big Little Lies	Oren Berg	11 episodes
2018	Shooter	Dr. Mitchell	Episode: "Red Light"
2018	Dirty John	Dave Canova	Episode: "Lord High Executioner"
2019	Trinkets	Doug Davis	14 episodes
2019	Jane the Virgin	Rev. Richard Flirdale	Episode: "Chapter Ninety-Five"
2019	9-1-1	Dave Kramer	Episode: "Kids Today"
2021	All Rise	Norman Heines	Episode: "Love's Illusions"
2022	For All Mankind	Ryan Bauer	4 episodes

== Other work ==
- 2002: American Idol (Video Game) (voice)
- 2011: L.A. Noire (Video Game) as A. D. A. Leonard Petersen (voice)
