= Career Day (Modern Family) =

- Modern Family episode
- Episode no.: Season 4 Episode 21
- Directed by: Jim Hensz
- Written by: Paul Corrigan; Brad Walsh
- Production code: 4ARG21
- Original air date: May 1, 2013

Guest appearance
- Rob Riggle as Gil Thorpe

Episode chronology
← Previous "Flip Flop"	Next → "My Hero"
- Modern Family season 4

"Career Day" is the 21st episode of the fourth season of the American sitcom Modern Family, and the series' 93rd episode overall. It was aired on May 1, 2013. The episode was written by Paul Corrigan & Brad Walsh and it was directed by Jim Hensz.

== Plot ==
It is Career Day at Luke (Nolan Gould) and Manny's (Rico Rodriguez) school, so their parents have to go to school with them and talk about their jobs. Phil Dunphy (Ty Burrell), while trying to talk about real estate, is upstaged by his rival, Gil Thorpe (Rob Riggle), who is also there for his daughter, and Phil's presentation is ruined. Later, Gil offers Claire (Julie Bowen) a position at his company, something that Phil disapproves of and tries to convince Claire not to accept, but she decides to take the job anyway. However, after one day at Gil's company, Claire quits the job since he treats her in a misogynistic way.

Jay (Ed O'Neill) reveals to Gloria that he always wanted to be a writer and had intended to start writing after his divorce with DeDe, but "life got in the way". Gloria (Sofía Vergara) tells him that he cannot write and she challenges him to write the thriller novel that he said he had put aside because of the lack of time. Jay tries to write but he struggles with it and Manny is the one who ends up writing the story. Jay presents it to Gloria as his but after Manny's reaction to her critique, the truth of who wrote the story comes out.

Lily (Aubrey Anderson-Emmons) loses her first tooth and she waits for the tooth fairy. Cam (Eric Stonestreet) and Mitch (Jesse Tyler Ferguson) accidentally give her $100 instead of $1 as a present from the tooth fairy. They try to get the money back but Lily is adamant. They ask for Haley's (Sarah Hyland) help, who dressed up as the tooth fairy to try to convince Lily that she has to return her the money but Lily recognizes her. Haley tries another approach (telling Lily she will be on Santa's "naughty list" for the rest of her life, but will have $100 as a compromise) which works, leaving Cam and Mitch surprised by Haley's success.

== Reception ==
=== Ratings ===
In its original American broadcast, "Career Day" was watched by 9.64 million; down 0.74 from the previous episode.

=== Reviews ===
"Career Day" received positive reviews.

Donna Bowman of The A.V. Club gave a B grade to the episode saying that the Career Day and the tooth fairy drama are two things that don't happen regularly in real life. Although, she stated: "The conventionality and overexposure of these plotlines isn’t a dealbreaker. Because if you’re a parent watching the show, it doesn’t matter that these situations aren’t really regular occurrences. They’re occasions for reliving the regularly recurring fears, hopes, and anxieties involved with having kids."

Leigh Raines from TV Fanatic rated the episode with 4/5 saying that it was a very decent episode.

Zach Dionne of Vulture also rated the episode with 4/5 saying: "This was a refreshingly cohesive half-hour, held together — in Manny's immortal words — by the web of lies we all weave for ourselves."

Dalene Rovenstine from Paste Magazine gave an 8.2/10 saying that "Career Day" was not a bad episode but with the show having its ups and downs this season, the episode showed that the show had plateaued.

Britt Hayes of Screen Crush gave a good review to the episode saying that overall was a solid half-hour.

Michael Adams from 411mania gave the episode 7/10 saying that it was not a strong episode to come back from a hiatus but not bad either. "Career Day itself had very little to do with this episode, even though what happened there between Phil and Gil, and Claire's breakdown, was very funny. [...] the Pritchetts didn't grab me at all this week, and the Dads were funny, but nothing special."
