= Charlie Lawrence =

- Genre: Sitcom
- Created by: Jeffrey Richman
- Starring: Nathan Lane
- Composer: Marc Shaiman
- Country of origin: United States
- Original language: English
- No. of seasons: 1
- No. of episodes: 7 (5 unaired)

Production
- Camera setup: Multi-camera
- Running time: 30 minutes
- Production companies: Jeffrey Richman Productions; CBS Productions; 20th Century Fox Television

Original release
- Network: CBS
- Release: June 15 – June 22, 2003

Charlie Lawrence is an American sitcom television series created by Jeffrey Richman, that aired on CBS from June 15 until June 22, 2003.

== Premise ==
A gay actor gets elected to congress as a representative from New Mexico.

== Cast ==
- Nathan Lane as Charlie Lawrence
- Laurie Metcalf as Sarah Dolecek
- Ted McGinley as Graydon Cord
- Stephanie Faracy as Suzette Michaels
- T.R. Knight as Ryan Lemming

== Episodes ==
No.	Title	Directed by	Written by	Original release date	Prod. code
1	"A Vote of No Confidence"	Jerry Zaks	Jeffrey Richman	June 15, 2003	1AGL79
Charlie has a disagreement with his chief of staff over how to cast his first vote.
2	"New Kid in School"	Jay Sandrich	Jeffrey Richman	June 22, 2003	1AGL01
Charlie tries to make new friends and gain acceptance on Capitol Hill.
3	"Charlie's Got Game"	Gary Halvorson	Kristin Gore & Nicholas Stoller	Unaired	1AGL05
Charlie participates in a basketball game after Sarah says that he acts too gay to be taken seriously as a politician.
4	"Dinner and a Breakdown"	Gary Halvorson	John Riggi	Unaired	1AGL02
Charlie throws a dinner party at his apartment.
5	"If It's Not One Thing, It's Your Mother"	N/A	Nancy Steen	Unaired	1AGL04
Charlie catches his mom stealing a clock at a reception for Queen Elizabeth.
6	"I'll Take the Low Road"	N/A	Jonathan M. Goldstein	Unaired	1AGL03
Graydon belittles Charlie during a televised debate.
7	"What's Wrong with This Picture?"	N/A	Jonathan Goldstein & John Riggi	Unaired	1AGL06
Charlie tries to hide his TV past, because he wants to date a sophisticated interior decorator.

== Reception ==
Reviews for Charlie Lawrence were mostly negative. Alessandra Stanley of The New York Times called the political satire "mild and formulaic".

The first episode of Charlie Lawrence got a rating of 0.9 in the 18- to 49-year-old demographic.
