= Heart Broken =

- Modern Family episode
- Episode no.: Season 4 Episode 15
- Directed by: Beth McCarthy-Miller
- Written by: Danny Zuker
- Production code: 4ARG18
- Original air date: February 13, 2013

Guest appearances
- Reid Ewing as Dylan; Beverly Leech as Dr. Coben; Brad Morris as Harlan

Episode chronology
← Previous "A Slight at the Opera"	Next → "Bad Hair Day"
- Modern Family season 4

"Heart Broken" is the 15th episode of the fourth season of the American sitcom Modern Family, and the series' 87th episode overall. It aired February 13, 2013. The episode was written by Danny Zuker and directed by Beth McCarthy-Miller.

== Plot ==
It is the day before Valentine's Day and Phil (Ty Burrell) and Claire (Julie Bowen) decide to bring back their alter egos, Clive Bixby and Julianna. While they are getting ready to move on to the hotel room, Claire faints and they end up in the hospital instead. The diagnosis, Wolff–Parkinson–White syndrome, requires Claire to "take it easy". Throughout the following day, Claire makes multiple advances on Phil, who wants her to simply rest. Phil accidentally tells Luke, Haley, and Alex that Claire suffered a "heart-related issue". Believing their mother had a heart attack, Luke, Haley, and Alex go see Claire to see how she is doing, but walk in on Claire and Phil. Phil, having suffered a nosebleed, accidentally gets blood on Claire, which only makes Luke, Haley, and Alex horrified.

On Valentine's Day, Gloria (Sofía Vergara) and Jay (Ed O'Neill) are trying to have a romantic day, but others keep interrupting them. Manny (Rico Rodriguez) has a date with a secret admirer and comes home to change his clothes. Joe and Lily (Aubrey Anderson-Emmons) are also in the house because Claire could not babysit them due to her "illness".

Cam (Eric Stonestreet) and Mitch (Jesse Tyler Ferguson) decide to do something different this year: throw a wild Valentine's Day Lonely Hearts Party to which they invite all their single friends. They wake up the next day with hangovers, not remembering what happened. While they are trying to put every piece together to understand what happened the previous night, Dylan (Reid Ewing) appears and thanks them for letting him stay with them. While they are struggling to find a way to tell him that he cannot stay, Lily is the one who makes the big step and tells him.

== Reception ==
=== Ratings ===
In its original American broadcast, "Heart Broken" was watched by 10.05 million, up 0.22 from the previous episode.

=== Reviews ===
"Heart Broken" received positive reviews.

Myles McNutt of The A.V. Club gave the episode a B− grade, saying that this episode didn't follow the "traditional road" of the show. ""Heart Broken" is formally nontraditional, eschewing a typical, balanced A-B-C story structure in favor of three separate stories told in sequential order, with each featuring one of the three central families."

Victoria Leigh Miller from Yahoo! TV stated that no other modern TV show does holidays like Modern Family. "In the end, this endearing yet decidedly unromantic episode gets to the heart of the family matters and is best summed up by Manny, who declares: "Happy Valentine's Day! It's the one day of the year when the world tries to be as romantic as I am all the time. Good luck, world."

Michael Adams from 411mania gave the episode 8.5/10, saying that it was one of the most creative episodes of Modern Family. "I liked how the [sic] broke it into 3 separate story lines, and more than that, I liked that each story was a different day. It was however, one of the few episodes where the entire family doesn't have any interaction with each other, but that's OK. I do think that without this interaction though, the story lines weren't as strong as they could have been."

Britt Hayes of Screen Crush gave the episode a good review, saying: "The writing and direction are great this week, with each story's conclusion leading beautifully into the next — from Claire learning that it's okay to worry, to Jay and Gloria trying to find the right balance between worry and giving their kids room to grow, to Mitch and Cam's adventure in living absolutely carefree for the night, the episode is a great example of 'Modern Family' doing what it does best."

Dalene Rovenstine of Paste Magazine rated the episode 8/10.

Leigh Raines of TV Fanatic rated the episode a 4/5, as did Zach Dionne of Vulture.
