= Steven Levitan =

American TV director, producer, and screenwriter (born 1962)

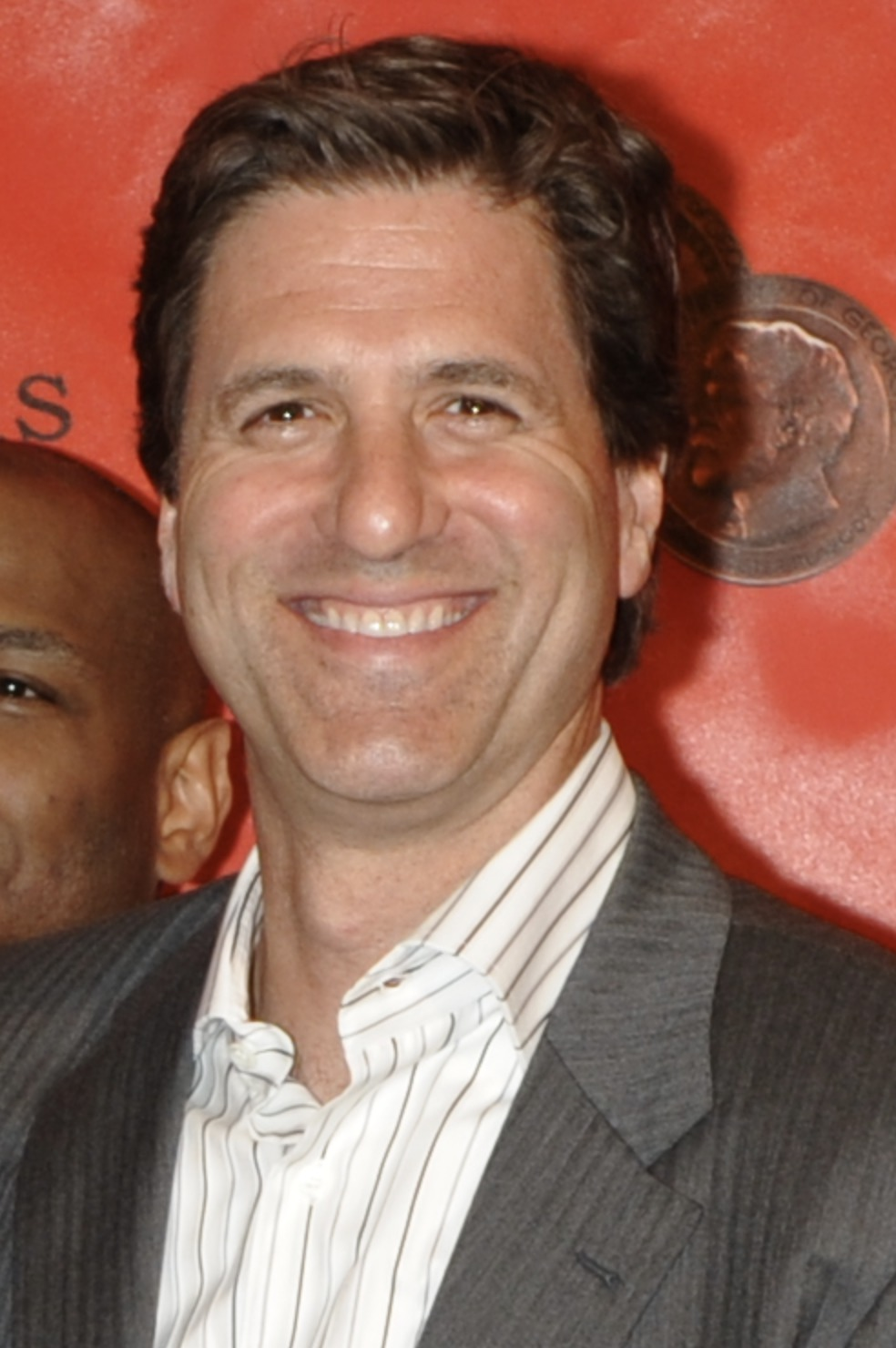
- Levitan in 2010
- Born: Steven E. Levitan; April 6, 1962 (age 64); Chicago, Illinois, U.S.
- Education: University of Wisconsin–Madison (B.A.)
- Occupations: Television producer; television director; screenwriter
- Years active: 1990–present
- Notable work: Just Shoot Me! Modern Family
- Spouses: Krista Levitan (m. 1992; div. 2018); Kristina McElligott (m. 2022)
- Children: 3

Steven E. Levitan (born April 6, 1962) is an American television producer, director, and screenwriter. He has created many television series such as Just Shoot Me!, Stark Raving Mad, Stacked, Back to You, Modern Family, and Reboot.

== Early life and education ==
Levitan was raised Jewish in Chicago, Illinois. He attended Glenbrook South High School and University of Wisconsin–Madison from 1980 to 1984, graduating with a bachelor's degree in journalism. While at college, he started his career in comedy working on shows for Humorology, a philanthropic comedy review held annually by fraternities and sororities.He is a member of Sigma Alpha Epsilon fraternity.

== Career ==
Levitan worked as a WKOW-TV on-air news reporter and morning anchorman in Madison, Wisconsin, and as a copywriter at Leo Burnett Advertising in Chicago. He moved to Hollywood in 1989.

As executive producer, Levitan won an Emmy Award in 1996 for Frasier in the Outstanding Comedy Series category. He was also nominated in that same year for Outstanding Writing in Comedy Series category for The Larry Sanders Show. He was nominated for an Emmy in the Outstanding Writing for a Comedy Series category for Just Shoot Me! and two more as executive producer. Levitan won the Humanitas Prize (for writers whose work best communicates and encourages human values) in 1996 for the Frasier episode titled "Breaking the Ice". Levitan has also won a CableACE Award and a Writers Guild nomination for The Larry Sanders Show. He also garnered a Producers Guild Award and a Television Critics Association Award for Frasier, a People's Choice Award for Stark Raving Mad and a Golden Globe nomination for Just Shoot Me!

His company, Steven Levitan Productions, has produced the series Just Shoot Me!, Stark Raving Mad, Greg the Bunny, Oliver Beene and Stacked.

Levitan and television writer/producer Christopher Lloyd joined as partners in 2006 and together created a production company named "Picture Day". It is under this company that they produced their co-creations Back to You and Modern Family. In 2010, Modern Family won the Emmy Award for Outstanding Comedy Series, as well as two other Emmy Awards: Outstanding Supporting Actor in Comedy Series for Eric Stonestreet, and Outstanding Writing for a Comedy Series for Steven Levitan and Christopher Lloyd. He has also earned Outstanding Directing for a Comedy Series nominations for Modern Family episodes "See You Next Fall" (2011) and "Baby on Board" (2012), winning the latter.

On June 19, 2018, Levitan, along with Seth MacFarlane and Judd Apatow, announced he was considering leaving 20th Century Fox as protest of Fox News's reporting of Donald Trump's family separation policy which is at odds with Modern Family's programming.

== Personal life ==
Levitan was married to his wife Krista from 1992 to 2018. They have three children, two daughters Hannah and Alexandra, and a son, Griffin.

In January 2016, Krista filed for divorce, filing a petition for a restraining order on the grounds of domestic violence, harassment, and intimidation against Levitan. Levitan denied the accusations, and the divorce was finalized in October 2018.

In July 2021, Levitan became engaged to Kristina Maria McElligott. They married on September 17, 2022. The wedding was a reunion for many members of the Modern Family cast.

== Filmography ==
Year	Title	Director	Writer	Producer	Creator
1990–1991	Max Glick	No	No	Yes	No
1991–1995	Wings	No	Yes	Yes	No
1994–1996	Frasier	No	Yes	Yes	No
1994	The Critic	No	Yes	No	No
1995	The Larry Sanders Show	No	Yes	Yes	No
1997	Men Behaving Badly	No	Yes	Yes	No
1997–2003	Just Shoot Me!	Yes	Yes	Yes	Yes
1999–2000	Stark Raving Mad	Yes	Yes	Yes	Yes
2000	Yes, Dear	Yes	No	No	No
2002–2004	Greg the Bunny	No	Yes	Yes	Yes
2003–2004	Oliver Beene	No	Yes	Yes	No
2005–2006	Stacked	Yes	Yes	Yes	Yes
2007–2008	Back to You	No	Yes	Yes	Yes
2009–2020	Modern Family	Yes	Yes	Yes	Yes
2018	LA to Vegas	Yes	No	Yes	No
2022	Reboot	Yes	Yes	Yes	Yes
2024-	Nobody Wants This	No	No	Yes	No

== Modern Family-related credits ==
=== Writer ===
- "Pilot"
- "The Incident"
- "Fifteen Percent"
- "Fears"
- "Unplugged"
- "Caught in the Act"
- "Boys' Night"
- "Send Out the Clowns"
- "Schooled"
- "Goodnight Gracie"
- "Three Dinners"
- "Message Received"
- "Clean Out Your Junk Drawer"
- "A Year of Birthdays"
- "Baby Steps" (teleplay)
- "Finale (Part One)"

=== Director ===
- "Hawaii"
- "Baby on Board"
- "See You Next Fall"
- "Treehouse"
- "Send Out the Clowns"
- "Baby on Board"
- "Bringing Up Baby"
- "When a Tree Falls"
- "Best Men"
- "The Wow Factor"
- "Goodnight Gracie"
- "First Days"
- "Three Dinners"
- "Australia"
- "The Wedding (Part One)"
- "Fight or Flight"
- "Connection Lost"
- "American Skyper"
- "Clean Out Your Junk Drawer"
- "The Party"
- "Thanksgiving Jamboree"
- "The Graduates"
- "In Your Head"
- "The Escape"
- "Kiss and Tell"
- "A Year of Birthdays"
- "Finale (Part One)"
