= Jeffrey Richman =

American actor and producer

- Occupation: Writer
- Years active: 1990–present
- Partner: John Benjamin Hickey (2003–present)

Jeffrey Richman is an American writer, producer and actor.

== Producer ==
- Uncoupled (2022): executive producer
- Modern Family: co-executive producer
- Stacked
- Frasier: executive producer
- Charlie Lawrence (2003): executive producer
- Stark Raving Mad (1999): co-executive producer
- Wings (1990): producer
- Rules of Engagement: co-executive producer

== Writer ==
- Uncoupled: 3 episodes, 2022
- Modern Family
- Rules of Engagement: 4 episodes, 2009–10
- Back to You: 3 episodes, 2007-8
- Stacked: 2 episodes, 2005-6
- Jake in Progress: 1 episode, 2005
- Frasier
- Charlie Lawrence
- Wings
- The Jeffersons: 1 episode, 1982

== Actor ==
- Cheers (1989–1991)
- Paper Dolls (1984)
- Drop-Out Father (1982)
- The Seduction (1982)
- Pray TV (1980)
- The Comedy Company (1978)

== Personal life ==
Richman is gay. Since 2003, his partner is actor John Benjamin Hickey.

== Awards and nominations ==
- Primetime Emmy: 1998 Outstanding Comedy Series for Frasier (1993).
- Primetime Emmy: 2011-2014 Outstanding Comedy Series for Modern Family
- Primetime Emmy: Outstanding Writing for a Comedy Series for Modern Family: Caught in the Act
- Nominated Primetime Emmy: 1999, 2010, 2015-2017
