= Becky Mann =

American screenwriter

Becky Mann is a television producer and screenplay writer, best known for her role as a writer in It's Always Sunny in Philadelphia and producer of Rules of Engagement.

== Career ==
Mann was first hired as a writer by Victor Fresco to write several episodes for his show Better Off Ted, writing two episodes before the show was canceled by ABC in 2010. Her work on the show created the opportunity to write for such shows as Notes from the Underbelly, It's Always Sunny in Philadelphia and Rules of Engagement.

=== It's Always Sunny in Philadelphia ===
Mann was hired by FX as a writer during the show's fifth season. Her work comprised episodes including "The Gang Exploits the Mortgage Crisis", "Mac Fights Gay Marriage", and "Dee Gives Birth".
