= Elaine Ko =

American television writer and producer

- Born: United States
- Citizenship: American
- Occupation: Writer
- Writing career
- Language: English

Elaine Ko is an American television writer and producer best known for her work on Modern Family and Only Murders in the Building.

== Early life ==
Ko is Korean American.

== Career ==
Ko's TV career began on the sitcom Back to You, where she was a writing assistant. From there, she was a staff writer on Do Not Disturb and Family Guy.

Her main breakthrough was with Modern Family (2011–20), where she worked as executive story editor, staff writer, producer, and executive producer. She also made an acting cameo, playing a receptionist in "The Future Dunphys" (2013), and directed two episodes ("Whanex?" and "The Prescott", 2019 and 2020). With Modern Family, Ko was the co-winner of seven awards: Primetime Emmy Award for Outstanding Comedy Series (twice), the American Comedy Award for Comedy Writing, the 2013 Humanitas Prize (30 Minute Category), an Online Film & Television Association Award for Best Writing in a Comedy Series, a PGA Award for Outstanding Producer of Episodic Television, Comedy, and a WGA Award for Best Comedy Series Writing.

She was also the individual winner of the Writers Guild of America Award for Television: Episodic Comedy for "Virgin Territory", and was nominated in 2013 for "Farm Strong".
