= Danny Zuker =

American television writer and producer (born c. 1964)

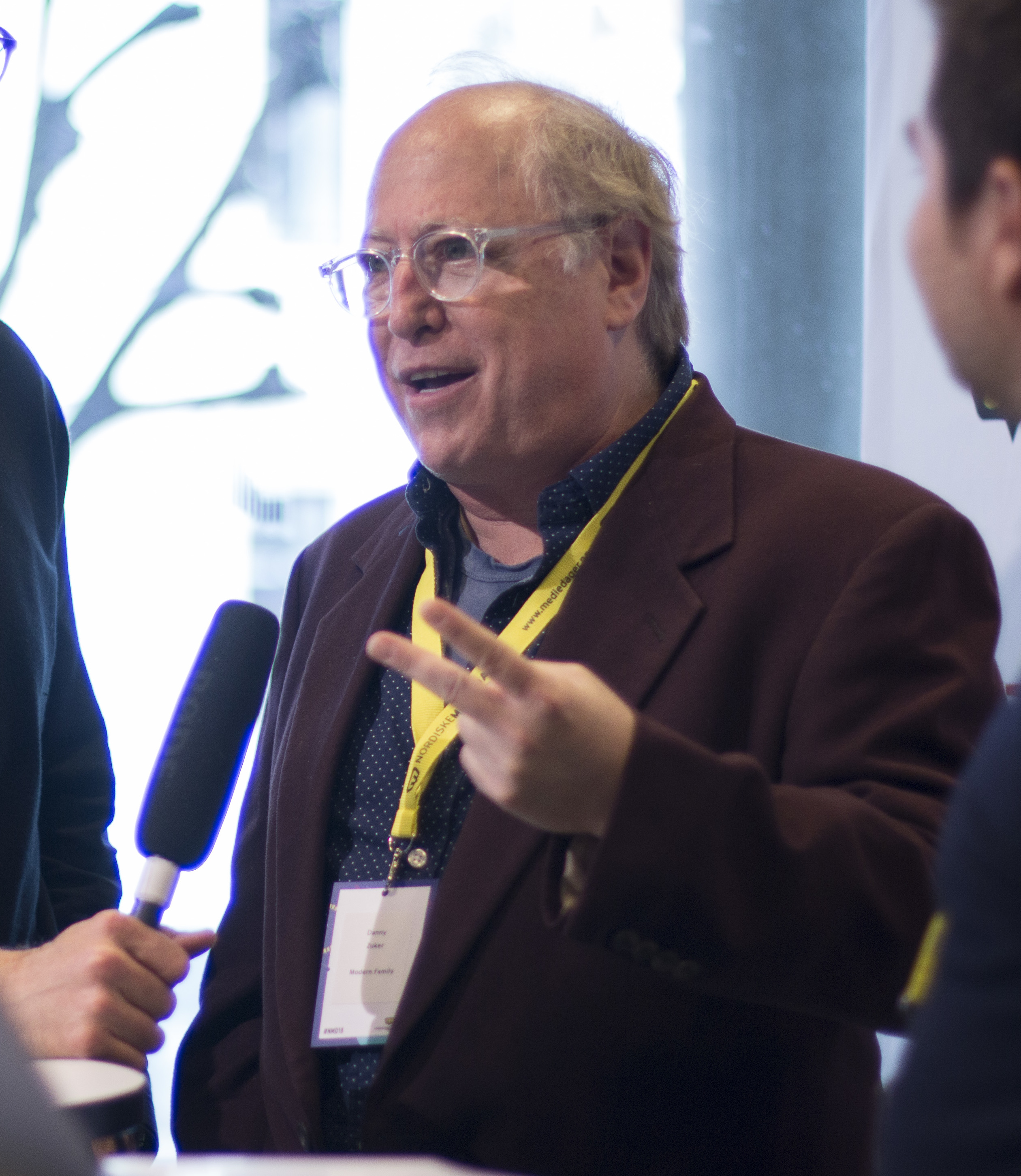
- Zuker in 2018
- Born: Daniel Zuker; January 27, 1964 (age 62)
- Education: Syracuse University
- Occupations: Television writer, producer
- Years active: 1990–present

Daniel Zuker (born January 27, 1964) is an American television writer and producer.

== Biography ==
Born to a Jewish family, Zuker graduated from Syracuse University in 1986, where he was a member of the Psi Upsilon fraternity. He is best known for his Emmy Award winning work as an executive producer and co-senior writer of ABC's Modern Family. Zuker has worked in various capacities, on a variety of TV shows, including Just Shoot Me, Grace Under Fire, and Roseanne. Zuker resides in Manhattan Beach, California, with his wife and three children.

Zuker grew up in Livingston, New Jersey and graduated in 1982 from Livingston High School.

Per the broadcast on April 17, 2013, Zuker also started out as an intern on The Howard Stern Show.

In May 2012, Zuker gave the keynote address at the graduation convocation of his alma mater, the S. I. Newhouse School of Public Communications.

On April 15, 2019, Zuker joined a host of other writers in firing their agents as part of the WGA's stand against the ATA and the practice of packaging.
