= Nolan Gould =

American actor (born 1998)

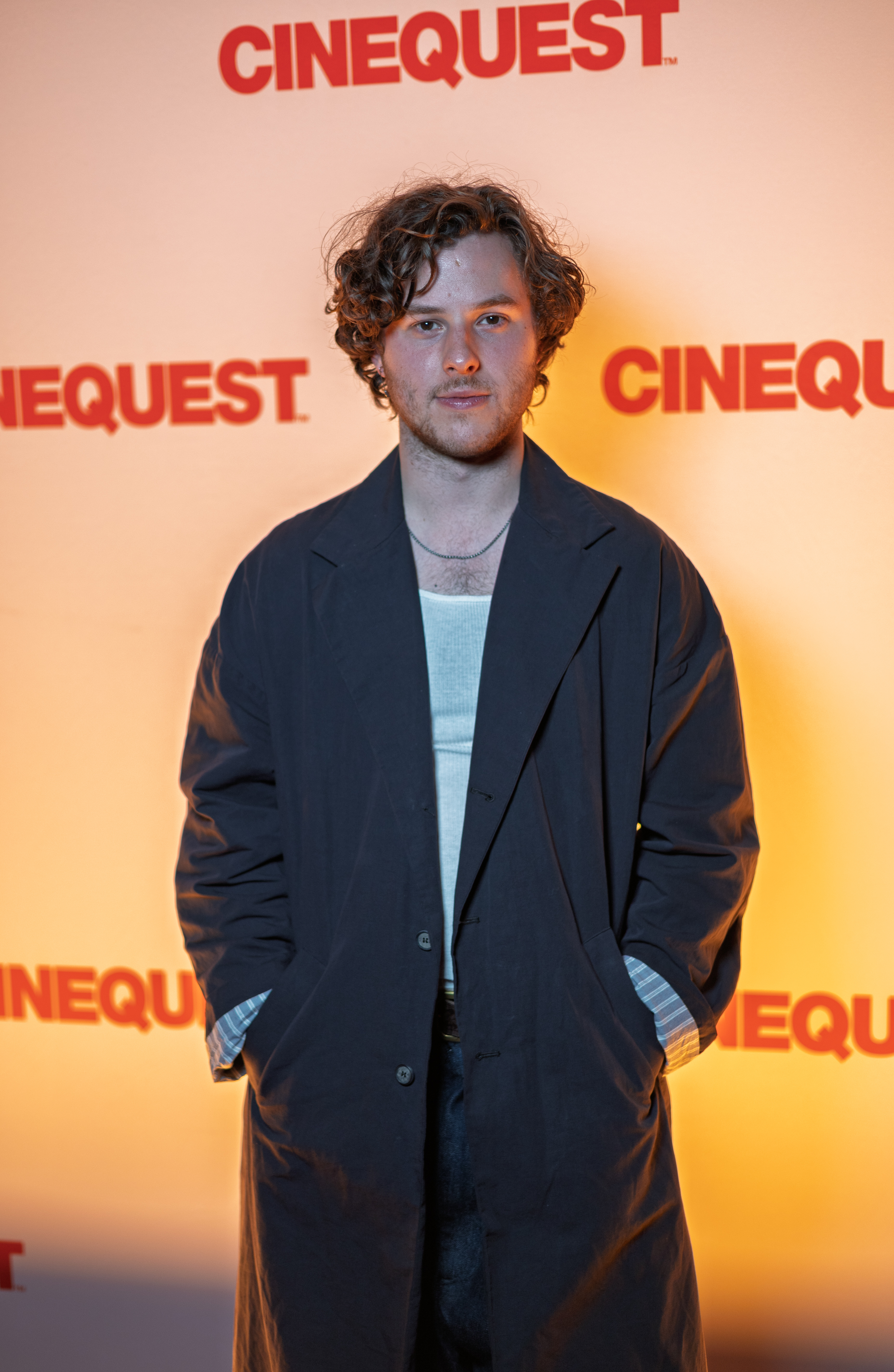
- Gould at the Cinequest Film Festival in 2026
- Born: October 28, 1998 (age 27); New York City, U.S.
- Occupation: Actor
- Years active: 2007–present
- Known for: Luke Dunphy in Modern Family
- Relatives: Aidan Gould (brother)

Nolan Gould (born October 28, 1998) is an American actor, widely known for his role as Luke Dunphy on the ABC sitcom Modern Family (2009–2020).

== Early life and education ==
Gould was born in New York City, to Angela and Edwin Gould. Shortly after his birth, he and his family moved to Phenix City, Alabama, due to his father's military career. When Gould was five years old, the family moved to California. His older brother, Aidan Gould, is also an actor.

Gould is a member of Mensa, and, as of 2012, had accelerated four grades in school. During summer 2012, at age 13, Gould took a General Educational Development (GED) test and said he hoped to take online college courses.

== Career ==
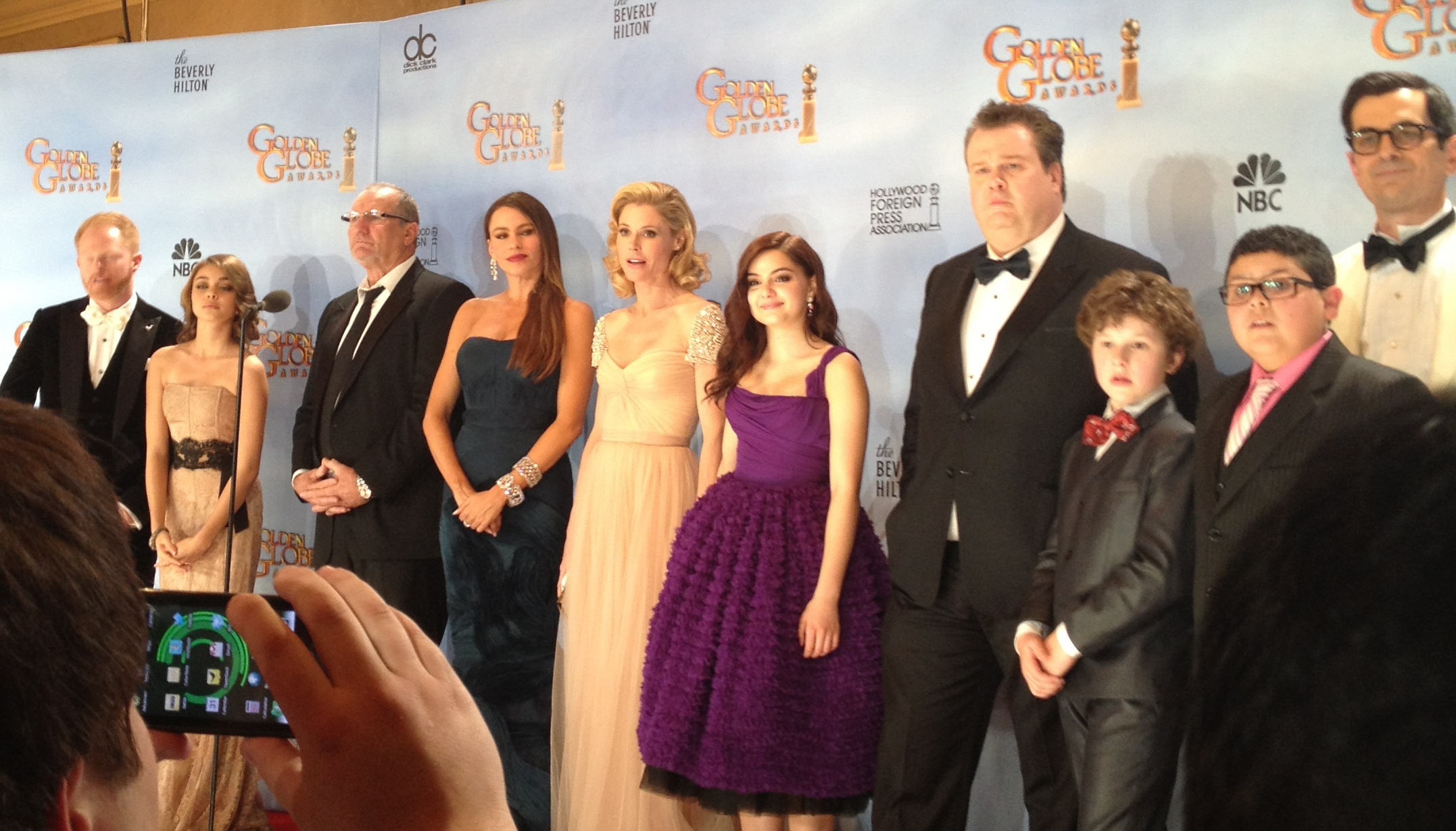
Gould (third from right) with the cast of Modern Family at the 69th Golden Globe Awards

Gould began his career at age three doing commercials. Gould began his acting career at the age of 8, when he made his short film debut in The McPassion as Son at Restaurant. He made his feature film debut in the 2007 comedy film Sunny & Share Love You, whereas he made his television debut in the live-action animated teen sitcom Out of Jimmy's Head portraying Jason, in which he played the role of young version of Dominic Janes' character Jimmy Roberts, he won for Best Young Ensemble Performance in a TV Series in 29th Young Artist Awards. In 2009, Gould played the role of Sam in the sci-fi comedy film Space Buddies, the third installment of the Air Buddies franchise.

His breakthrough came as Luke Dunphy, youngest child and son of Phil (Ty Burrell) and Claire (Julie Bowen) on the Emmy-winning smash Modern Family. As of the 2014–15 TV season, Gould made over US$70,000 per episode for his role on Modern Family. Buoyed by his Modern Family fame, Gould also landed a small role in the big screen comedy Friends with Benefits, in which he played the role of Sammy. In 2011, he was the lead in the feature film Ghoul, based on the novel by Brian Keene. In 2013, Gould played the role of Max in the romantic comedy film by Maggie Carey titled The To Do List, which was released on July 26, 2013. Gould appeared in the 2014 war drama film Field of Lost Shoes, where he played the role of Robert / Sir Rat.

In 2017, Gould was featured in the music video for Logic's hit song, "1-800-273-8255," the number for the National Suicide Prevention Lifeline. In 2019, Gould starred alongside Oscar Nuñez in the drama film Yes, in which he played the lead role of Jeremiah Rosenhaft.

In 2023, Gould appeared in the period drama film Miranda's Victim as James Valenti. In the same year, Gould appeared in the mockumentary comedy film The Nana Project, directed by Robin Givens, in which he played Andrew.

== Filmography ==
=== Film ===
Year	Title	Role	Notes
2007	The McPassion	Son at Restaurant	
2007	Waiting Room	Wild Child	
2007	Sunny & Share Love You	Jason	
2008	Montana	Johnny	
2008	Sweet Nothing in My Ear	Mark Scott	Television film
2009	Space Buddies	Sam	
2009	Hysteria	Child	
2010	Monster Heroes	Young Jonas Stein	
2011	Friends with Benefits	Sammy	
2012	Ghoul	Timmy Graco	Television film
2012	Abominable Christmas	Adam / Sweet Kid	Television film
2013	The To Do List	Max	
2014	Field of Lost Shoes	Robert / Sir Rat	
2019	Yes	Jeremiah Rosenhaft	
2023	Miranda's Victim	James Valenti	
2023	The Nana Project	Andrew	
2023	Camp	Ivan	

=== Television ===
Year	Title	Role	Notes
2007	Out of Jimmy's Head	Young Jimmy	Episodes: "Outdoors" and "Bully"
2007	America's Most Wanted: America Fights Back	Young Paul Jackson	Episode: "Paul Jackson"
2008	Eleventh Hour	John Warner	Episode: "Containment"
2009–2020	Modern Family	Luke Dunphy	Main role; 247 episodes
2010	Good Luck Charlie	Zander	Episode: "Sleepless in Denver"
2011–2014	The Haunting Hour: The Series	Jack Pierce / Greg	Episodes: "Best Friend Forever" and "Lotsa Luck"
2014	Whose Line is it Anyway?	Himself	Season 10 Episode 7
2015	Sofia the First	Elliot (voice)	Episode: "Substitute Cedric"
2016	Hell's Kitchen	Himself (Guest diner)	Episode: "When the Wall Comes Tumbling Down"
2018	Worst Cooks in America: Celebrity Edition	Himself (Contestant)	Eliminated
2020	What's Up North	Travis Tordjman	Episodes: "Meat", "Space", "Operation Save Humanity"
2021	Celebrity Dating Game	Himself	Bachelor
2022	Grey's Anatomy	Chase Sams	Episode: "Wasn't Expecting That"

=== Music videos ===
Year	Title	Artist
2017	"1-800-273-8255"	Logic featuring Alessia Cara and Khalid
2019	"Help Me Now"	Kevin McHale

== Awards and nominations ==
Year	Award	Category	Work	Result	Ref.
2008	Young Artist Award	Best Young Ensemble Performance in a TV Series	Out of Jimmy's Head	Won	
2010	Young Artist Award	Best Young Ensemble Performance in a TV Series	Modern Family	Won	
2010	Gold Derby Awards	Ensemble of the Year	Modern Family	Won	
2010	Screen Actors Guild Awards	Outstanding Performance by an Ensemble in a Comedy Series	Modern Family	Nominated	
2011	Young Artist Award	Outstanding Young Ensemble in a TV Series	Modern Family	Nominated	
2011	Screen Actors Guild Awards	Outstanding Performance by an Ensemble in a Comedy Series	Modern Family	Won	
2012	Young Hollywood Awards	Scene Stealer	Modern Family	Won	
2012	Screen Actors Guild Awards	Outstanding Performance by an Ensemble in a Comedy Series	Modern Family	Won	
2013	Screen Actors Guild Awards	Outstanding Performance by an Ensemble in a Comedy Series	Modern Family	Won	
2014	Screen Actors Guild Awards	Outstanding Performance by an Ensemble in a Comedy Series	Modern Family	Won	
2015	Screen Actors Guild Awards	Outstanding Performance by an Ensemble in a Comedy Series	Modern Family	Nominated	
2016	Screen Actors Guild Awards	Outstanding Performance by an Ensemble in a Comedy Series	Modern Family	Nominated	
2017	Screen Actors Guild Awards	Outstanding Performance by an Ensemble in a Comedy Series	Modern Family	Nominated	
2018	Legionnaires of Laughter Legacy Awards	Best Children's Comedy Artist Male	Modern Family	Nominated	
2019	Bergen International Film Festival of NJ	Best Actor	Yes	Won	
2019	Best Actor Award	Best Duo	Yes	Won	
2019	Oniros Film Awards	Best Ensemble/Duo	Yes	Won	
