= Little Bo Bleep =

- Modern Family episode
- Cameron (Eric Stonestreet) flees out of the church giggling with Lily (Aubrey Anderson-Emmons) after she says the F-word
- Episode no.: Season 3 Episode 13
- Directed by: Chris Koch
- Written by: Cindy Chupack
- Production code: 3ARG14
- Original air date: January 18, 2012

Guest appearance
- David Cross as Duane Bailey

Episode chronology
← Previous "Egg Drop"	Next → "Me? Jealous?"
- Modern Family season 3

"Little Bo Bleep" is the 13th episode of the third season of the American sitcom Modern Family. It premiered on ABC on January 18, 2012. The episode was written by Cindy Chupack and directed by Chris Koch.

Despite the controversy around Lily's (Aubrey Anderson-Emmons) plotline of a toddler cursing, "Little Bo Bleep" received positive reviews. The creator of the show, Steven Levitan, made it clear that Anderson-Emmons never really said "fuck"; instead she said "fudge".

== Plot ==
Claire decides to run for town council (episode: "Hit and Run") and she has to prepare for an upcoming debate against her opponent, Duane Bailey, who is running for his seventh time. Phil (Ty Burrell) and the kids want to help her get ready, especially after a newspaper critic writes that people find her "angry and unlikable". They conduct a mock interview in the family living room, during which they all try to make her lose "bad" habits such as rolling her eyes, pointing her finger and being sarcastic.

At the Pritchett house, Jay worries about his dog Stella because she keeps jumping into the pool without knowing how to swim. He blames Gloria (Sofía Vergara) for Stella's suicidal behavior since Gloria does not love the dog and always screams at her.

Lily is going to be the flower girl at a wedding the family will be attending. The blue dress Mitch and Cam ordered for her, however, has built-in lights. Out of nowhere, Lily says "fuck", causing Cam to giggle (his weakness is children cursing) and leave the room. Mitch and Cam try to tell her that she shouldn't say that word, however, Cam keeps laughing every time she says it, which undermines the point.

At the debate, things do not go really well for Claire. Duane brings up the incident Phil had on Valentine's Day when he went to the wrong hotel room waiting for Claire. Phil tries to defend himself but he just makes things worse and ends up going viral for his autotuned and edited version of his explanation on YouTube.

After the debate, the whole family meets at the wedding. When Claire and Phil arrive, Cam and Mitch pretend that they did not watch the debate on TV. Cam and Mitch explain that Lily is not allowed to talk at all in order to prevent her from saying the "f-word" in public. When the ceremony starts, Cam starts crying because he always does so at weddings. Lily sees him and, in an attempt to "cheer him up", says the word to get him to laugh. The whole church starts laughing, so Lily keeps repeating it, causing Cam to rush her giggling out of the church apologizing as the rest of the family and the other guests descend into hysterics.

The episode ends with Jay putting a life vest on Stella so she can swim in the pool without drowning. Stella immediately goes to the filter of the pool and Manny (Rico Rodriguez) finds out that the reason she was jumping in the pool all along was to reach her stuck dog toy. Jay finds it funny but Gloria does not.

== Reception ==
=== Ratings ===
In its original American broadcast, "Little Bo Bleep" was watched by 11.89 million; down 0.23 from the previous episode.

=== Reviews and controversy ===
The episode was met with some controversy for the portrayal of a little girl swearing, although Aubrey Anderson-Emmons never actually said the word on camera. She was asked to say "fudge" during filming.

Despite the negative reaction before the episode aired, the episode received positive reviews, with almost everyone saying that Lily's storyline is something that happened in almost all the families who have a toddler as a member and many of them agreed that the highlight of the episode was Claire's plot and the debate.

Leigh Raines from TV Fanatic rated the episode with 5/5 and said "Great post-GoldenGlobes episode for the Modern Family crew. For me it was chock full of amazing quotes, not including Lily's little slip up." About the controversy she mentions: "Modern Family has always prided itself on being realistic and representing true-to-life situations. So why should it gloss over something as basic and common as the fact that little kids sometimes mimic bad words they hear their parents say?. [sic] And just like Cam did, sometimes people laugh! If people are being that uptight one little curse word, sorry, but you're watching the wrong show."

Christine N. Ziemba of Paste Magazine gave the episode 8/10 stating that the episode wasn't "as awesome as it could be" and that "...an opportunity was missed by the writer Cindy Chupack (who also wrote the episode “Express Christmas”) on a real story". On the controversy: "Modern Family is probably one of the least offensive shows on television right now. [...] Next time, if a toddler saying a faux f-word gets your panties in a bunch, we suggest the radical protest move of turning off the television."

Maris Kreizman of Vulture gave a good review to the episode stating that it was "one of the strongest of an uneven third season" and that there was not controversy on it, regarding Lily's storyline.

Rachel Stein from Television Without Pitty named the episode one of the best yet with Lily's plotline to be the weakest one.

Verne Gay of Newsday also gave a good review to the episode saying that it was "one of the funniest half hours of television all year". "Little Bo Bleep" was a brilliant episode; nothing remotely offensive about it, and the message was pretty clear: Watch what you say around toddlers, and certainly don't laugh if they say something they shouldn't have said."

Adam Reisinger mentions on his blog that "Little Bo Bleep" is "one of the best and most true to life in terms of raising a toddler." He closes his blog saying: "I'm sure even after seeing the episode, there will be some people who complain about a storyline that has a two-year-old uttering a profanity, but those are the kind of people who are just looking to stir up shit. In reality, Modern Family handled the storyline well, made it funny, and ended up with one of the best episodes of the season."

James Poniewozik talked about the controversy saying that it "will blow over quickly" and that the best part of the episode was Claire's plot. "...if not for the controversy, I probably would hardly have paid attention to this subplot. For my money the best part of the episode was Claire’s preparation and debate for the council election, which featured some fine physical comedy from Julie Bowen as Claire physically fought her instinct to roll her eyes and point her finger."
