= Egg drop =

Egg drop may refer to:

- Egg drop competition, an experiment usually performed by students
- Egg drop soup, a Chinese soup dish
- Eggdrop, a popular IRC bot
- Egg Drop, an episode of the television series Modern Family
- Egg drop syndrome or EDS, a bird disease caused by an avian adenovirus
- Egg dropping puzzle, a popular problem in mathematics and computer science
