= Me? Jealous? =

- Modern Family episode
- Greg Kinnear guested as Phil's (Ty Burrell) new prospective client
- Episode no.: Season 3 Episode 14
- Directed by: Michael Spiller
- Written by: Ben Karlin
- Production code: 3ARG13
- Original air date: February 8, 2012

Guest appearances
- Greg Kinnear as Tad; Phil Hendrie as Booker Bell

Episode chronology
← Previous "Little Bo Bleep"	Next → "Aunt Mommy"
- Modern Family season 3

"Me? Jealous?" is the 14th episode of the third season of the American sitcom Modern Family and the series' 62nd episode overall. It was aired on February 8, 2012. The episode was written by Ben Karlin and directed by Michael Spiller.

== Plot ==
Phil (Ty Burrell) has a new prospective client named Tad (Greg Kinnear) whom he invites to his home to talk about the house he wants to sell. Tad comes, and he is extremely friendly to Claire (Julie Bowen) since he kisses her on the lips for hello and goodbye. Claire finds his move inappropriate while Phil does not mind about it, telling Claire that it does not mean anything. Tad comes back the next day to invite Claire and Phil to his home, and he continues kissing Claire. At his home, Claire sees that he kisses every woman that way, even the members of his family, so she can relax and enjoy Tad's jokes, something that Phil does not like at all.

Haley (Sarah Hyland) fibbed on her college applications claiming that she is a Big Sister, so Claire and Phil forced her to join the Big Brothers Big Sisters organization. Now, she has to work as a Big Sister to her new "Little Sister" Annie (Alexis Fowlkes), something that she does really well, causing Alex's (Ariel Winter) reaction. The two girls start fighting, and Luke (Nolan Gould) angrily interferes to make them stop and tells them that they were both bad big sisters to him. Luke's words make Alex and Haley remember their old habits when they were younger, and they were dressing up Luke, something that Luke is not happy about.

Meanwhile, Cam (Eric Stonestreet) and Mitch (Jesse Tyler Ferguson) have to stay with Jay (Ed O'Neill) and Gloria (Sofía Vergara) for a few days because their house is being fumigated. This cohabitation causes some issues between the four of them.

Cam rearranges the kitchen so it can be more practical, something that Gloria does not like while Gloria starts doing things with Lily (Aubrey Anderson-Emmons) like taking her shopping and fixing her hair, something that upsets Cam.

Jay keeps making jokes about Mitch's job, something that Mitch does not appreciate much. Things get more intense when Mitch says that he has a professional meeting with radio DJ Booker Bell (Phil Hendrie) whom Jay admires. and he appears at the meeting uninvited. Mitch feels embarrassed with Jay's behavior, and he asks him to leave because he is working.

Manny (Rico Rodriguez) sees the tension and he tries to make them understand that what they are doing is not on purpose to upset the other by making up stories similar to theirs presenting them as his problem. At first they do not understand but at the end, they manage to solve their differences.

== Reception ==
=== Ratings ===
In its original American broadcast, "Me? Jealous?" was watched by 12.90 million; up 1.01 million from the previous episode.

=== Reviews ===
"Me? Jealous?" received mixed reviews.

Meredith Blake from The A.V. Club gave a B+ to the episode. "I tend to like it when Modern Family pairs up characters who don't usually share a storyline. [...] For the writers, it's an effective way to generate fresh new ideas; for the viewer, it's a useful reminder that these characters are individuals with relationships of their own, not just component parts of their own nuclear family."

Leigh Raines of TV Fanatic gave 4/5 to the episode "...while "Me? Jealous?" once again featured a lot of in-fighting, I'm happy to note the sitcom finally shook things up and took the familial squabbles to new territory."

Hallie Cantor of Split Sider said that the episode was full of fun plotlines with strong character motivations. "In a series that can sometimes fall into repetitive storylines, the focus on jealousy here felt fresh. And MVP of the night might just be Manny, for trying to solve everyone else's conflicts with helpful allegories about his friend Danielle."

Carlos Uribe from TV Liar said that overall it was a good episode. "It had a common theme of jealousy and how this can create tension between people. It's also worth nothing that misunderstandings created the jealousy. This created a strong episode that was filled with many great gags. Greg Kinnear was a good guest star and he didn't take the show overall."

Nick from The Signal stated that "Me? Jealous?" was not an un-funny episode. "[It] may not have been this year’s strongest episode, but for Modern Family that just means a great show just did “above-average” for one week instead of the normal “excellent.”"

Christine N. Ziemba from Paste Magazine gave 7.8/10 to the episode saying that as a whole, the episode was average. "We did appreciate the usual pairings, especially the dynamic between Gloria and Cam. They were petty without being annoying or shrill—which is usually what happens when Jay gets stuck with one of his kids. However, our biggest pet peeve was the blatant copying of the SNL skit (a G-rated version, of course)."

Zac Oldenburg from Television Blend also names the episode average. "Modern Family mixed things up this week, and for that I am terribly appreciative, but unfortunately the episode didn’t bring the funny. Smatterings of laughs are sure to be had week to week on the show, but again the show was unable to break out beyond that. Still, I am glad they are trying to mix things up and I hope they can continue to do so more in the future."

JeffEightyOne of Ape Donkey said that it was "one of the lesser episodes of the season, if not maybe the worst." "Aside from just not being very funny, “Me? Jealous?” also didn't play to any of its strengths from a character dynamic standpoint."
