= Schooled (Modern Family) =

- Modern Family episode
- Episode no.: Season 4 Episode 2
- Directed by: Jeff Melman
- Written by: Steven Levitan; Dan O'Shannon
- Production code: 4ARG03
- Original air date: October 10, 2012

Guest appearances
- Wendi McLendon-Covey as Pam; Michaela Watkins as Susan; Tom McGowan as Principal Roth

Episode chronology
← Previous "Bringing Up Baby"	Next → "Snip"
- Modern Family season 4

"Schooled" is the second episode of the fourth season of the American sitcom Modern Family, and the series' 74th episode overall. It aired October 10, 2012. The episode was written by Steven Levitan & Dan O'Shannon and directed by Jeff Melman.

== Plot ==
Over dinner, Phil (Ty Burrell) gives a lengthy toast to Haley's (Sarah Hyland) upcoming first day of college while Mitch (Jesse Tyler Ferguson) announces that Lily (Aubrey Anderson-Emmons) is starting kindergarten and Manny (Rico Rodriguez) shares that Jay (Ed O'Neill) and Gloria (Sofía Vergara) have enrolled in parenting classes.

The following morning, Alex (Ariel Winter) and Luke (Nolan Gould) say their goodbyes before Claire (Julie Bowen), Phil, and Haley leave for the college. There, Haley is quickly embarrassed by her parents and insists they leave. Before departing, Phil gifts her a book of life lessons he calls "Phil's-osophy". On the way home, an emotional Phil and Claire receive a call from Haley who thanks them; they all tear up.

Lily gets into a fight with another classmate, Connor (Mason McNulty). Cam (Eric Stonestreet) rushes to her rescue but his use of physical force against Connor prompts the principal (Tom McGowan) to call Cam and Mitch into his office. Connor's parents, Pam (Wendi McLendon-Covey) and Susan (Michaela Watkins), are also present. The principal suggests Lily and Connor have a playdate. It does not go well, but Pam and Susan are unable to leave when Lily and Connor lock themselves in Lily's room. When everything settles down, the two couples, despite their differences, admit that when it comes to their kids, they are very much alike.

Gloria and Jay do not take the class very seriously, and after they share their experience of how to raise a baby, they leave early. Manny is disappointed in them and he cannot understand why they are not worried while he is terrified. Jay reassures him that everything is going to be fine and he will not let anything happen to the baby or him.

== Reception ==
=== Ratings ===
In its original American broadcast, "Schooled" was watched by 12.08 million; down 2.36 from the previous episode. The next episode of the show, Snip was aired the same day and it was watched by 12.31 million; up 0.23 from "Schooled".

=== Reviews ===
"Schooled" received mostly positive reviews along with "Snip", the third episode of the season that was aired at the same night.

Michael Adams of 411mania gave the episode 10/10 saying that he loved the episode and praising Phil's story. "I have said in the past that the show is at its best when the entire family is together, which we briefly had in the beginning, but when they are separate and each dealing with their own troubles and issues they can really shine."

Leigh Raines of TV Fanatic rated "Schooled" with a 4.5/5 stating that this was "one of the funnier episodes in awhile [sic]."

Donna Bowman of The A.V. Club gave an A− grade to both episodes saying that she can't wait for more. "Two episodes showcasing solid construction, excellent timing, and graceful fillips of feeling. Suddenly, Modern Family seems to be brimming with confidence, looking forward to the possibilities of a rearranged cast of characters. I can’t wait to see more."

Dalene Rovenstine of Paste Magazine rated both episodes with 8.2/10. "It’s too early to say, but this duo of episodes seem to be paving the way for a better season. Although the premiere was lackluster, these episodes provided laughs reminiscent of the first two seasons."

Wyner C of Two Cents TV gave a good review to the episode saying that it was a "hoot". " I truly loved the touching moments with laughs along the way. My farewell sendoff to college did not contain any tears – did yours?"

Pollysgotyournumbers of Bitch Stole My Remote also gave a good review to the episode stating: "Despite some of the crash-and-burns, this episode is still packed with charm and the show’s trademark attention to the emotions behind the jokes. I am looking forward to how they deal with Haley’s absence and what kind of effect it will have on the story arc this season."
