= Modern Family season 3 =

Modern Family
- Season 3
- Region 1 DVD cover
- Starring: Ed O'Neill; Sofía Vergara; Julie Bowen; Ty Burrell; Jesse Tyler Ferguson; Eric Stonestreet; Sarah Hyland; Ariel Winter; Nolan Gould; Rico Rodriguez; Aubrey Anderson-Emmons
- No. of episodes: 24

Release
- Original network: ABC
- Original release: September 21, 2011 – May 23, 2012

Season chronology
- ← Previous; Season 2 Next → Season 4

The third season of the American television sitcom Modern Family aired on ABC from September 21, 2011 to May 23, 2012.

This season was ordered on January 10, 2011. The season was produced by Lloyd-Levitan Productions in association with 20th Century Fox Television, with series creators Steven Levitan and Christopher Lloyd serving as showrunners.

This season like the previous seasons won the Primetime Emmy Award for Outstanding Comedy Series, Outstanding Supporting Actor in a Comedy Series for Eric Stonestreet (third consecutively and second for Stonestreet), Outstanding Supporting Actress in a Comedy Series for Julie Bowen (second consecutive), along with Outstanding Directing for a Comedy Series for Steven Levitan, among the fourteen nominations it earned. It also won the Golden Globe Award for Best Television Series – Musical or Comedy.

== Production ==
=== Crew ===
The third season of the show was produced by 20th Century Fox Television and Lloyd-Levitan Productions and aired on the American Broadcasting Company (ABC). Modern Family is produced by co-creators Christopher Lloyd and Steven Levitan who serve as executive producers and show runners with Bill Wrubel as co-executive producer. The season premiere was filmed at a dude ranch according to Modern Family star Eric Stonestreet. The top choice for the setting for the dude ranch was Jackson, Wyoming. Other cities that were under consideration were Tucson, Arizona and Bozeman, Montana. The premiere will also be the first one-hour episode for the series. The season featured the second Christmas episode and the first Thanksgiving episode. The season also added new writers including Cindy Chupack as co-executive producer and Ben Karlin as consulting producer. On February 29, 2012, the cast filmed an episode on location at Disneyland. The episode aired on May 9, 2012.

=== Cast ===
Modern Family employs an ensemble cast. The series is set in Los Angeles and focuses on the family lives of Jay Pritchett (Ed O'Neill), his daughter Claire Dunphy (Julie Bowen), and his son Mitchell Pritchett (Jesse Tyler Ferguson). Claire is a homemaker mom married to Phil Dunphy (Ty Burrell); they have three children, Haley (Sarah Hyland), the typical teenager, Alex (Ariel Winter), the smart middle child and Luke (Nolan Gould), the offbeat only son. Jay is married to a much younger Colombian woman, Gloria (Sofía Vergara), and is helping her raise her pre-teen son, Manny (Rico Rodriguez). Mitchell and his partner Cameron Tucker (Eric Stonestreet) have adopted a Vietnamese baby, Lily (Aubrey Anderson-Emmons). The kids are only required to appear in 22 episodes.

Near the end of the second season, there were rumors of the producers recasting the role of Lily, and changing her age from a baby to a toddler. In July 2011, a casting call for a "3- to 4-year-old daughter of Mitchell and Cameron" was put out by the producers. They eventually cast Aubrey Anderson-Emmons to replace Jayden and Ella Hiller. The season will also feature the developing of Lily's character. There is a possibility of Cameron and Mitchell adopting another baby although it is not definite. The season will also feature Haley's senior year of high school, and her being shown at least one prospect for college. The season will also feature several guest stars. In the season premiere, Tim Blake Nelson guest starred as a cowboy who "intimidates the guys and sends the girls' hearts a-twitter". Benjamin Bratt is currently slated to guest star as Manny's biological father and Gloria's ex-husband. This will mark Bratt's second appearance on the series. David Cross will also have a recurring role on the series as a city councilman who becomes enemies with Claire.

== Episodes ==
| No. overall | No. in season | Title | Directed by | Written by | Original release date | Prod. code | U.S. viewers (millions) |
|---|---|---|---|---|---|---|---|
| 49 | 1 | "Dude Ranch" | Jason Winer | Paul Corrigan & Brad Walsh & Dan O'Shannon | September 21, 2011 | 3ARG03 | 14.52 |
While vacationing at Lost Creek Ranch in Jackson Hole, Wyoming, the three families try their hands at a little cattle herding, skeet shooting, and horseback riding. There are also some big firsts, a huge surprise, and an actual face-off between Jay and a cowboy named Hank (Tim Blake Nelson).
| 50 | 2 | "When Good Kids Go Bad" | Michael Spiller | Jeffrey Richman | September 21, 2011 | 3ARG02 | 14.54 |
Mitchell and Cameron plan an evening with the whole family to break the happy news that they're attempting to adopt another child. However, things go poorly when they realize that Lily may not take well to another baby in the house. Meanwhile, Claire and Jay are each focused on proving a point.
| 51 | 3 | "Phil on Wire" | Jason Winer | Teleplay by : Danny Zuker; Story by : Bianca Douglas & Danny Zuker | September 28, 2011 | 3ARG01 | 13.45 |
The growing bond between Jay and the dog, Stella, gets on Gloria's nerves. Meanwhile, Phil and Luke go on a tightrope, but it's Claire with the missteps as she tries to teach the girls a life lesson. Cam's juice fast creates tension between him and Mitchell.
| 52 | 4 | "Door to Door" | Chris Koch | Bill Wrubel | October 5, 2011 | 3ARG04 | 13.24 |
Jay is determined to help Manny sell wrapping paper for a school fundraiser. Claire petitions the city for a stop sign to be installed at a high-traffic intersection. Mitchell tries to prove a point with Cameron, and neither one of them will back down. Phil and Luke attempt to create a viral video sensation. Finally, Gloria is desperate to find Stella after losing her.
| 53 | 5 | "Hit and Run" | Jason Winer | Elaine Ko | October 12, 2011 | 3ARG06 | 13.65 |
Phil and Claire's encounter with an annoying city councilman (David Cross) on the campaign trail gets Claire thinking about throwing her hat into the ring. Meanwhile, Gloria's offer for help fall on deaf ears with Jay, who's frustrated at work, and Manny, who's worried about school; and Mitchell and Cameron have a hit-and-run fender bender that leads to a confrontation with a kid who's bothering Haley.
| 54 | 6 | "Go Bullfrogs!" | Scott Ellis | Abraham Higginbotham | October 19, 2011 | 3ARG07 | 13.04 |
When Phil takes Haley to his Alma Mater on a trip to visit colleges, Claire persuades Mitchell and Cameron to include her in their boys' night out. Meanwhile, Gloria and Jay are alarmed at how fast Manny appears to be growing up. Note: Ariel Winter and Aubrey Anderson-Emmons did not appear in this episode.
| 55 | 7 | "Treehouse" | Jason Winer | Steven Levitan | November 2, 2011 | 3ARG08 | 13.37 |
Gloria persuades Jay to commit to a night of salsa dancing after seeing how much his friend Shorty (Chazz Palminteri) and his girlfriend (Jennifer Tilly) do together. Meanwhile, Cameron makes a bet that he can get a woman's (Leslie Mann) phone number at the bar and Phil builds a tree house for Luke. Note: Ariel Winter and Aubrey Anderson-Emmons did not appear in this episode.
| 56 | 8 | "After the Fire" | Fred Savage | Danny Zuker | November 16, 2011 | 3ARG09 | 12.91 |
The Pritchetts rally for a good cause after a neighbor's house burns down, but there's a downside to their Samaritan intentions when Jay injures his back. Cameron takes on a moving truck and some donated toys fall into the wrong hands. Note: Aubrey Anderson-Emmons did not appear in this episode.
| 57 | 9 | "Punkin Chunkin" | Michael Spiller | Ben Karlin | November 23, 2011 | 3ARG05 | 12.72 |
A former neighborhood resident, now rich and successful, returns for a visit. Jay thinks Manny needs constructive criticism and Mitchell questions the authenticity of Cameron's colorful childhood stories.
| 58 | 10 | "Express Christmas" | Michael Spiller | Cindy Chupack | December 7, 2011 | 3ARG10 | 12.20 |
The family gathers at Jay and Gloria's pool on a sunny December day, and realize that everyone will be scattered this coming Christmas, so they set off with their respective duties to throw an impromptu Christmas celebration. Therefore, Mitchell, Alex and Lily search for a tree, Jay and Cameron wrap gifts, Phil and Manny shop for the groceries, Gloria and Luke retrieve the angel, that Claire and Mitchell's mother made them, from the attic, and Claire and Haley shop for last-minute gifts.
| 59 | 11 | "Lifetime Supply" | Chris Koch | Jeffrey Richman & Bill Wrubel | January 4, 2012 | 3ARG11 | 14.03 |
Phil contemplates the worst, after missing a call from the doctor. Elsewhere, Javier, Manny's biological father, pays another visit to take his son to the horse races. Mitchell wins an environmental law award, creating a competition between Cam and himself on who has the better trophy. Gloria tutors Haley in Spanish.
| 60 | 12 | "Egg Drop" | Jason Winer | Paul Corrigan & Brad Walsh | January 11, 2012 | 3ARG12 | 12.12 |
Jay and Claire take control of their kids' school projects from Manny and Luke, while Haley and Gloria help Phil with a real estate presentation. Elsewhere, Cam and Mitchell meet with a potential birth mother. Note: Aubrey Anderson-Emmons did not appear in this episode.
| 61 | 13 | "Little Bo Bleep" | Chris Koch | Cindy Chupack | January 18, 2012 | 3ARG14 | 11.89 |
Claire prepares for her debate with Duane Bailey. Mitch and Cam try to clean up Lily's language before her turn as a flower girl. Jay blames Stella's strange behavior on Gloria.
| 62 | 14 | "Me? Jealous?" | Michael Spiller | Ben Karlin | February 8, 2012 | 3ARG13 | 12.90 |
Claire believes that Phil's new prospective client is inappropriate, but she cannot convince a trusting Phil. Meanwhile, Cam and Mitchell stay with Gloria and Jay, while their house is being fumigated.
| 63 | 15 | "Aunt Mommy" | Michael Spiller | Abraham Higginbotham & Dan O'Shannon | February 15, 2012 | 3ARG15 | 11.23 |
After selling a house to Mitch and Cameron's friends, Claire and Phil plan a celebratory dinner; overindulging in drinks leads to over sharing.
| 64 | 16 | "Virgin Territory" | Jason Winer | Elaine Ko | February 22, 2012 | 3ARG17 | 11.54 |
It's a day of disturbing realizations when Mitchell manages to ruin one of Jay's proudest golf moments, Phil overhears something that may forever change how he sees his little girl, and Gloria stumbles upon Claire's dangerous little secret. Luke and Manny try to get Lily into trouble because she is too cute.
| 65 | 17 | "Leap Day" | Gail Mancuso | Danny Zuker | February 29, 2012 | 3ARG19 | 11.63 |
Mitchell feels pressured to make Cameron's birthday extra special; people start to question Jay's manliness; the girls' "cycles" interfere with Phil's leap day plans.
| 66 | 18 | "Send Out the Clowns" | Steven Levitan | Steven Levitan & Jeffrey Richman & Bill Wrubel | March 14, 2012 | 3ARG16 | 10.60 |
Cameron's former clown partner comes to town. Meanwhile, another real estate agent obtains a listing Phil was trying to land. Elsewhere, a new friend of Manny's has Gloria and Jay suspicious.
| 67 | 19 | "Election Day" | Bryan Cranston | Ben Karlin | April 11, 2012 | 3ARG20 | 10.35 |
On Election Day, the family does some last-minute campaigning for Claire. Claire experiences technical difficulties during interviews. Note: Aubrey Anderson-Emmons did not appear in this episode.
| 68 | 20 | "The Last Walt" | Michael Spiller | Dan O'Shannon & Paul Corrigan & Brad Walsh | April 18, 2012 | 3ARG21 | 10.21 |
Claire tries to help Luke cope with the death of their neighbor, Walt. Phil and Alex spend some time together. Haley throws a pool party without permission at Jay and Gloria's house; Cameron's father visits.
| 69 | 21 | "Planes, Trains and Cars" | Michael Spiller | Paul Corrigan & Brad Walsh | May 2, 2012 | 3ARG18 | 10.06 |
Phil's friend Andre (Kevin Hart) convinces him to buy a two-seat convertible instead of his regular Cadillac, to which Claire's response is far from expected. Cam and Mitchell lose Lily's favorite stuffed rabbit on the subway and go to great lengths to recover it. Meanwhile, Jay, Gloria and Manny take a trip to Jay's high-school reunion but run into trouble along the way.
| 70 | 22 | "Disneyland" | James Bagdonas | Cindy Chupack | May 9, 2012 | 3ARG22 | 10.58 |
When the family travels to Disneyland, Phil struggles to keep up with Luke. Claire tries to set Haley up with her friends nephew Ethan (Matt Prokop) but is stunned when they run into Dylan. Cam and Mitch try to curb Lily's new penchant for running.
| 71 | 23 | "Tableau Vivant" | Gail Mancuso | Elaine Ko & Jeffrey Richman & Bill Wrubel | May 16, 2012 | 3ARG23 | 9.36 |
Gloria and Jay bicker while trying to order lunch at a diner; Claire and Cam have different theories on how to discipline kids; Luke accepts an award under false pretenses; Phil has a hard time firing Mitchell from his temporary job at the real estate agency; the entire family participates in Alex's living art display of Norman Rockwell's Thanksgiving painting "Freedom from want".
| 72 | 24 | "Baby on Board" | Steven Levitan | Abraham Higginbotham | May 23, 2012 | 3ARG24 | 10.07 |
While Gloria helps Cam and Mitch pursue an adoption opportunity, Jay and Manny baby-sit Lily; Alex attends her first prom; Haley makes a shocking announcement about her plans for the future; and Gloria makes a surprise announcement in the end.

== Reception ==
=== Reviews ===
The season has received an overall positive reception, most of which stated that the series had lost some of its originality and wit while falling prey to comedy clichés, while praising its writing and humour. Slant Magazine reviewer Peter Swanson wrote that while the first episode was "the type of wacky-location stunt that's usually reserved for the fifth or sixth season of a dying sitcom", the following episodes "have been better [...] but they're still uneven". He also criticized the writers for relying too much on "stunt episodes and celebrity cameos, like David Cross". He ultimately gave the season 3 out of 4 stars. HitFix reviewers Alan Sepinwall and Daniel Feinberg considered the season uneven and Feinberg criticized the season for the multitude of guest stars like David Cross. Sepinwall also criticized the writing for Bowen's character for being "shrill and angry". Despite this, they both complimented the performance of the kids. James Parker of The Atlantic said, at the beginning of the third season that "Modern Family is very, very funny, almost ruthlessly so," [It's] a bit of a master class in pace and brevity ... The writing is Vorsprung durch Technik: hectically compressed but dramatically elegant, prodigal in its zingers and snorters but austere in its construction." He found it an exception to his dislike for sitcoms that eschew a laugh track. Despite the recent criticism from some critics, the third season won its first Golden Globe Award for Best Television Series – Musical or Comedy, beating out two-time winner Glee.

=== Ratings ===
Like the previous two seasons, Modern Family aired Wednesday at 9:00pm and is coupled with Happy Endings. Aided by winning the Primetime Emmy Award for Outstanding Comedy Series for the second time, ratings for the one-hour season premiere, "Dude Ranch" / "When Good Kids Go Bad", rose up 18% compared to the previous season premiere, "The Old Wagon" making it the highest rated episode for the series and the highest rated ABC premiere in six years. "Dude Ranch" / "When Good Kids Go Bad" finished first in the ratings with a 6.2 rating among adults between the ages of 18 and 49. The high ratings have led to a rise in cost for an ad, with an average of $249,388 per 30-second commercial, making it one of the highest costing shows of the season.

Viewership and ratings per episode of Modern Family season 3
| No. | Title | Air date | Rating/share (18–49) | Viewers (millions) | DVR (18–49) | DVR viewers (millions) | Total (18–49) | Total viewers (millions) |
|---|---|---|---|---|---|---|---|---|
| 1 | "Dude Ranch" | September 21, 2011 | 6.2/15 | 14.52 | 2.4 | 4.70 | 8.6 | 19.23 |
| 2 | "When Good Kids Go Bad" | September 21, 2011 | 6.0/15 | 14.54 | 2.3 | 4.63 | 8.3 | 19.17 |
| 3 | "Phil on Wire" | September 28, 2011 | 5.7/15 | 13.45 | 2.2 | 4.46 | 7.9 | 17.91 |
| 4 | "Door to Door" | October 5, 2011 | 5.7/15 | 13.24 | 2.4 | 4.82 | 8.1 | 18.06 |
| 5 | "Hit and Run" | October 12, 2011 | 5.9/14 | 13.65 | 2.4 | 4.71 | 8.3 | 18.36 |
| 6 | "Go Bullfrogs!" | October 19, 2011 | 5.7/14 | 13.04 | 2.3 | 4.39 | 8.0 | 17.44 |
| 7 | "Treehouse" | November 2, 2011 | 5.7/14 | 13.37 | 2.6 | 4.92 | 8.3 | 18.29 |
| 8 | "After the Fire" | November 16, 2011 | 5.6/14 | 12.91 | 2.4 | 4.81 | 8.0 | 17.73 |
| 9 | "Punkin Chunkin" | November 23, 2011 | 4.6/12 | 12.72 | —N/a | —N/a | —N/a | —N/a |
| 10 | "Express Christmas" | December 7, 2011 | 5.1/13 | 12.20 | 2.5 | 4.94 | 7.6 | 17.14 |
| 11 | "Lifetime Supply" | January 4, 2012 | 5.7/14 | 14.03 | 2.4 | 4.85 | 8.1 | 18.88 |
| 12 | "Egg Drop" | January 11, 2012 | 5.1/13 | 12.12 | 2.3 | 4.57 | 7.4 | 16.70 |
| 13 | "Little Bo Bleep" | January 18, 2012 | 5.1/12 | 11.89 | 2.7 | 5.24 | 7.8 | 17.13 |
| 14 | "Me? Jealous?" | February 8, 2012 | 5.5/14 | 12.90 | 2.7 | 5.17 | 8.2 | 18.09 |
| 15 | "Aunt Mommy" | February 15, 2012 | 4.7/12 | 11.23 | 2.7 | 5.46 | 7.4 | 16.71 |
| 16 | "Virgin Territory" | February 22, 2012 | 4.8/12 | 11.54 | 2.8 | 5.20 | 7.6 | 16.76 |
| 17 | "Leap Day" | February 29, 2012 | 4.8/12 | 11.63 | 2.7 | 5.20 | 7.5 | 16.76 |
| 18 | "Send Out the Clowns" | March 14, 2012 | 4.5/12 | 10.60 | 2.5 | 4.82 | 7.0 | 15.42 |
| 19 | "Election Day" | April 11, 2012 | 4.2/11 | 10.35 | 2.0 | 4.25 | 6.2 | 14.60 |
| 20 | "The Last Walt" | April 18, 2012 | 4.1/11 | 10.21 | 2.3 | 4.51 | 6.4 | 14.72 |
| 21 | "Plains, Trains and Cars" | May 2, 2012 | 4.1/11 | 10.06 | 2.1 | 4.13 | 6.2 | 14.19 |
| 22 | "Disneyland" | May 9, 2012 | 4.4/12 | 10.58 | 2.3 | 4.54 | 6.7 | 15.12 |
| 23 | "Tableau Vivant" | May 16, 2012 | 3.9/11 | 9.36 | 2.3 | 4.34 | 6.2 | 13.70 |
| 24 | "Baby on Board" | May 23, 2012 | 4.1/11 | 10.07 | —N/a | —N/a | —N/a | —N/a |

== Awards and nominations ==
=== Primetime Emmy Awards ===
Despite the mixed reviews, the third season received 14 Primetime Emmy Award nominations, the most nominations for a comedy, and won five of them.

Primetime Awards
| Year | Category | Nominees | For role/episode | Outcome |
|---|---|---|---|---|
| 2012 | Outstanding Comedy Series | Modern Family | | Won |
| 2012 | Outstanding Supporting Actor in Comedy Series | Eric Stonestreet | Cameron Tucker | Won |
| 2012 | Outstanding Supporting Actor in Comedy Series | Jesse Tyler Ferguson | Mitchell Pritchett | Nominated |
| 2012 | Outstanding Supporting Actor in Comedy Series | Ty Burrell | Phil Dunphy | Nominated |
| 2012 | Outstanding Supporting Actor in Comedy Series | Ed O'Neill | Jay Pritchett | Nominated |
| 2012 | Outstanding Supporting Actress in Comedy Series | Julie Bowen | Claire Dunphy | Won |
| 2012 | Outstanding Supporting Actress in Comedy Series | Sofia Vergara | Gloria Delgado-Pritchett | Nominated |
| 2012 | Outstanding Directing for a Comedy Series | Steven Levitan | Episode: "Baby on Board" | Won |
| 2012 | Outstanding Directing for a Comedy Series | Jason Winer | Episode: "Virgin Territory" | Nominated |
Primetime Creative Arts Awards
| 2012 | Outstanding Casting for a Comedy Series | Jeff Greenberg | | Nominated |
| 2012 | Outstanding Guest Actor in a Comedy Series | Greg Kinnear | Role: Tad; Episode: "Me? Jealous?" | Nominated |
| 2012 | Outstanding Single-Camera Picture; Editing for a Comedy Series | Ryan Case | Episode: "Leap Day" | Nominated |
| 2012 | Outstanding Single-Camera Picture; Editing for a Comedy Series | Steven A. Rasch | Episode: "Election Day" | Nominated |
| 2012 | Outstanding Sound Mixing for a Comedy or Drama Series (Half-Hour) and Animation | Modern Family | Episode: "Dude Ranch" | Won |

=== Golden Globes ===
The show won the Golden Globe Award for Best Television Series – Musical or Comedy.

== Home video release ==
The Third season of Modern Family was released on DVD and Blu-ray both in a three-disc set on September 18, 2012. The box-set contains all 24 episodes and include Deleted and Extended Scenes, behind-the-scenes featurettes, a Blooper Reel and more.

Modern Family: The Complete Third Season
| Set Details | | Special Features |
| 24 episodes; 3-disc set; 1.78:1 aspect ratio; English (Dolby Digital 5.1) (DVD); English (DTS-HD Master Audio 5.1) (Blu-ray); Subtitles: English, French, Spanish, Portuguese and Cantonese; Runtime: 516 minutes | | Deleted & Alternate Scenes; Destination: Wyoming - Behind-the-scenes of the season premiere "Dude Ranch"; A Day on the Set with Ty; Adventures of the Modern Family Kids; A Modern Family Christmas; Driving Lessons; Ed O'Neill Gets a Star; Modern Family goes to Disneyland Resort; Gag Reel |
Release Dates
| Region 1 | Region 2 | Region 4 |
| September 18, 2012 | October 1, 2012 | October 19, 2012 |
