= Snip (Modern Family) =

- Modern Family episode
- Episode no.: Season 4 Episode 3
- Directed by: Gail Mancuso
- Written by: Danny Zuker
- Production code: 4ARG02
- Original air date: October 10, 2012

Guest appearances
- Kevin Daniels as Longinus; Edward Tournier as Jeoux

Episode chronology
← Previous "Schooled"	Next → "The Butler's Escape"
- Modern Family season 4

"Snip" is the third episode of the fourth season of the American sitcom Modern Family, and the series' 75th episode overall. It aired October 10, 2012. The episode was written by Danny Zuker and directed by Gail Mancuso.

== Plot ==
Haley (Sarah Hyland) video calls the Dunphy house to chastise Claire (Julie Bowen) for not sending her clothes. She notices Alex (Ariel Winter) has changed her clothing style and accuses her of trying to be more like her new goth friend, Skylar. Luke (Nolan Gould) takes a handful of yogurt tubes from the fridge for a trap he's setting in his locker. Phil (Ty Burrell) mentally prepares for his upcoming vasectomy; he and Claire will have an empty house in five years and plan to keep it that way.

Gloria (Sofia Vergara) and Jay (Ed O'Neill) visit their physician for a check-up. Jay wishes to know the child's sex, but Gloria wants to keep it a surprise. While changing, Gloria blames the dry-cleaner for shrinking her pants, prompting Jay to suggest she switch to maternity clothes; she disagrees. After a day out with Manny (Rico Rodriguez), however, she finally accepts that she is gaining weight and shops for maternity clothes.

Claire has to drop off Luke's science project, meaning she's unavailable to accompany Phil to his appointment; she arranges for him to go with Jay. There, Phil gets scared and runs. Catching up to him, Jay confesses that he's worried about having a daughter because he thinks he's not sensitive enough to raise a girl. Unlike with Claire, if he messes up during childhood, he might not have time to repair the relationship in adulthood. Hearing that there is something which Jay fears, Phil agrees to go through with the procedure.

At the middle school, Claire attempts to put Luke's science project in his locker and falls victim to his trap; Luke is embarrassed and verbally calls her out. Back home, Claire walks in on Skylar preparing to shave Alex's neck. Claire pretends to be okay with it, taking the hair trimmer for herself and waving it around dramatically; she accidentally shaves off a portion of Skylar's hair which prompts Skylar to storm out angrily. Alex runs after her, angry at Claire.

With Lily (Aubrey Anderson-Emmons) in kindergarten, Cameron (Eric Stonestreet) now has significant free time. Mitchell (Jesse Tyler Ferguson) conspires with their friend Longinus to get Cam a part-time job at his store, but another employee, Jeoux, unintentionally reveals the plot and upsets Cam. Later, he talks with Mitchell, accepts that he's unfulfilled, and decides to search for a part-time job.

Claire overhears Alex and Haley on a video call; they're laughing about Claire cutting off Skylar's hair. Luke then apologizes by presenting Claire with a rose. Later, she and Phil agree not to go through with the procedure, saying they'll wait five years.

== Reception ==
=== Ratings ===
In its original American broadcast, "Snip" was watched by 12.31 million; up 0.23 from the previous episode, Schooled, that was aired the same night.

=== Reviews ===
"Snip" received mixed reviews in contrast to "Schooled", the second episode of the season that was aired at the same night.

Leigh Raines of TV Fanatic rated "Snip" with a 4/5 saying that this was a family-fun night on ABC and as for Claire's relationship with her three kids she stated: "I found everything about Claire's interaction with the kids to be so realistic in this episode."

Donna Bowman of The A.V. Club gave an A− grade to both episodes saying that she can't wait for more. "Two episodes showcasing solid construction, excellent timing, and graceful fillips of feeling. Suddenly, Modern Family seems to be brimming with confidence, looking forward to the possibilities of a rearranged cast of characters. I can’t wait to see more."

Dalene Rovenstine of Paste Magazine rated both episodes with 8.2/10. "It’s too early to say, but this duo of episodes seem to be paving the way for a better season. Although the premiere was lackluster, these episodes provided laughs reminiscent of the first two seasons."

Britt Hayes from Screen Crush stated that this episode was a step up from the previous one.

Michael Adams of 411mania rated the episode with 7/10 saying that "the show had him on the first episode of the night but they lost him on the second one." Adams said that "...it was funny and well written, but not the greatest episode ever."

Pollysgotyournumber of Bitch Stole My Remote said that the episode fell flat after the last one. "A few smaller stories are pursued in this episode, which is fine, but I feel that it lacks the thematic loop-closing that I’ve come to love about this show’s writing."

Zach Dionne from Vulture rated the episode with 3/5 while Shayelizatrotter of The Comedy Critic gave a C+ rate to the episode who also, like Pollysgotyournumber, said that it fell flat.
