= Bringing Up Baby (Modern Family) =

- Modern Family episode
- Episode no.: Season 4 Episode 1
- Directed by: Steven Levitan
- Written by: Paul Corrigan; Brad Walsh
- Production code: 4ARG01
- Original air date: September 26, 2012

Guest appearances
- Chazz Palminteri as Shorty; Reid Ewing as Dylan; Ernie Hudson as Miles

Episode chronology
← Previous "Baby on Board"	Next → "Schooled"
- Modern Family season 4

"Bringing Up Baby" is the first episode of the fourth season of the American sitcom Modern Family, and the series' 73rd episode overall. It aired on September 26, 2012. The episode was written by Paul Corrigan & Brad Walsh and directed by Steven Levitan.

Ed O'Neill submitted this episode for consideration due to his nomination for the Primetime Emmy Award for Outstanding Supporting Actor in a Comedy Series at the 65th Primetime Emmy Awards.

== Plot ==
Manny (Rico Rodriguez) starts off Jay's (Ed O'Neill) 65th birthday with jokes about his age; Jay, meanwhile, insists that he wants a quiet 65th birthday to celebrate his current peaceful life. Regardless, Phil (Ty Burrell), with Jay's friends Shorty (Chazz Palminteri) and Miles (Ernie Hudson), forcibly takes him fishing. While on the water, Shorty and Miles reinforce Jay's earlier conclusion that he's worked hard and deserves to live out his life in peace and comfort without responsibility.

Gloria (Sofía Vergara) worries that Jay will be upset with her pregnancy, especially after hearing him muse about his obligation-free future. She tells Manny (Rico Rodriguez), who, after Luke (Nolan Gould) suggests Jay will love his "real son" more, worries that his earlier jokes about his old age will cause Jay to entirely replace him with the new baby. Gloria privately tells Claire (Julie Bowen) about her pregnancy. Knowing that Jay is prone to offensive responses, she tells him that sensitive news will be presented to him and he needs to respond kindly.

Cam (Eric Stonestreet) and Mitch (Jesse Tyler Ferguson) attempt to donate the extravagant baby gifts given by their friends. Lily (Aubrey Anderson-Emmons) asks for a kitten to replace the brother she thought she was getting. At the animal shelter, Cam is upset to discover that there is an adoption process for the cat; they do not get a pet but instead decide to take a trip to London.

Haley (Sarah Hyland) has Dylan (Reid Ewing) ask Claire if he can stay with the Dunphys for a couple weeks. Claire initially refuses, prompting Dylan to attempt to manipulate her by detailing his difficult alternate living arrangements.

Phil and Jay return home and are greeted with the news that Mitch and Cam are looking to get a cat. Jay, thinking this is the news Claire warned him about, confuses everyone with his over-enthusiastic positive response. A misunderstanding causes Manny to accidentally reveal there will be a new baby, forcing Gloria to tell the whole family. She furiously declares that she will raise the baby alone if she must, but Jay reveals that he's elated by the news and excited by the opportunity to raise another child.

A few months later, the family is gathered again at Jay's house. Manny reads a poem he's written for his future sibling while Cam and Mitch gift them a souvenir from London and reveal they've since gotten a cat. Dylan, who has been staying with the Dunphys, is kicked out by Claire.

== Reception ==
=== Ratings ===
In its original American broadcast, "Bringing Up Baby" was watched by 14.44 million.

=== Reviews ===
The episode received positive reviews, with multiple reviewers waiting for more in the following episodes.

Donna Bowman of The A.V. Club gave an A− grade to the episode. "I love this. It’s a fantastic way to remind us that as standard-issue as we might peg Modern Family to be, it’s not going to let us characterize it as lazy."

Leigh Raines of TV Fanatic gave a 4.5/5 stating that watching the episode made her realize how much she had missed Dunphy/Pritchett clan. "However, the second he [Phil] giggled at Manny's lame joke and cracked that goofy grin, I realized how much I've missed the Dunphy/Pritchett clan these past few months. Between Manny's overly adult mannerisms and Haley and Claire's constant bickering, I loved catching up with everyone."

Michael Adams of 411mania rated the episode with 9/10. "I thought they started this season perfectly, especially since it was a "Jay Birthday episode" which has historically given us great moments. I will admit, I was very skeptical of them starting the episode back in May, but the transition from then to now was absolutely amazing. Kicking off a season is always hard, especially when the series is following a story arch throughout the entire season. We know that the baby is coming and a lot of things will be based on it, but the way they got us into it with tonights episode was fantastic."

Dalene Rovenstine from the Paste Magazine gave the episode 7/10.
