= Baby on Board (Modern Family) =

- Modern Family episode
- Episode no.: Season 3 Episode 24
- Directed by: Steven Levitan
- Written by: Abraham Higginbotham
- Production code: 3ARG24
- Original air date: May 23, 2012

Guest appearances
- Reid Ewing as Dylan; Terri Hoyos as Abuela

Episode chronology
← Previous "Tableau Vivant"	Next → "Bringing Up Baby"
- Modern Family season 3

"Baby on Board" is the 24th episode and season finale of the third season of the American sitcom Modern Family, and the series' 72nd episode overall. It aired on May 23, 2012 on ABC. The episode was written by Abraham Higginbotham and directed by Steven Levitan. The episode features guest actors Reid Ewing and Terri Hoyos. It was viewed by 10.07 million people in its original US broadcast.

== Plot ==
Mitchell (Jesse Tyler Ferguson) and Cameron (Eric Stonestreet) are getting ready for Lily's (Aubrey Anderson-Emmons) dance recital when they receive a phone call from the adoption agency telling them a woman in Calexico has chosen them and gone into early labor. They drop Lily off with Jay (Ed O'Neill) and Manny (Rico Rodriguez) while bringing Gloria (Sofía Vergara) as translator; she gets carsick on the ride down. At the hospital, Gloria translates that the child is healthy but a series of increasingly dramatic events involving associates and members of the family culminate in the grandmother (Terri Hoyos) deciding to raise the child herself.

At the recital, Lily gets stage fright--in part due to Mitch and Cam's absence--and Jay agrees to dance with her while Manny records.

Alex (Ariel Winter) is getting ready to attend her first prom. Phil (Ty Burrell) and Claire (Julie Bowen) are excited that she's attending but are equally shocked that Haley (Sarah Hyland) isn't. Instead, she goes or job interview and picks up groceries to cook a dinner for her parents and Dylan (Reid Ewing). Alex's date, Michael (Joe Metcalf), arrives; Phil and Claire think he’s gay.

After dinner, Dylan lets it slip that he and Haley plan to move into an apartment after her graduation, now that she has a job and will be taking community college classes. Claire is against this, explaining to Haley that this will be the first in a series of life choices Haley may regret when she's older. Haley calls Claire out for being pessimistic before Dylan and Luke reveal that Haley got a college acceptance letter from a four-year school. Dylan insists she go, but not before they go to prom for a symbolic final night together.

That morning, Alex reveals that she had a great time at prom while Haley is hungover and Dylan is asleep on the couch. Claire gives Haley a fake hangover remedy that cause her to throw up.

Returning from Calexico, a heartbroken Mitch and Cam decide to put their adoption plans on hold while Gloria learns that she's pregnant.

== Reception ==
=== Ratings ===
In its original American broadcast, "Baby on board" was watched by 10.07 million viewers; up 0.71 million viewers from the previous episode.

=== Reviews ===
The final episode of season 3 received critical acclaim, with some critics labelling it as one of the greatest episodes of the show thus far. Many critics laid praise on the emotional depth of Mitchell and Cameron's story, the well crafted humour and the use of a cliffhanger ending. This finale was also very well received by fans, with the episode gaining a score of 8.7 on IMDb; the highest of the season.

Donna Bowman of The A.V. Club gave a B+ grade. For the way the writers closed the show she stated: "...I don’t mind the cliffhanger at all. Not only is this a genuinely new dynamic for the show to explore [...] but it’s also presented in the context of the repetition of childhood through each succeeding stage in life.".

Leigh Raines of TV Fanatic gave a 5/5 grade saying that "Baby On Board" might have been her favorite episode of all-time. "For an Emmy-winning show that had a pretty mediocre season, I'm totally shocked to say that I think "Baby on Board" might've been my favorite Modern Family episode of all-time. It had it all. The true mark of a perfect sitcom is a show that can take you from laughing to crying in a matter of seconds - and this episode served up plenty of that. And all with a super surprising ending!"

Christine N. Ziemba of Paste Magazine rated the episode with a 9/10, closing her review with: "We liked the fact that the Modern Family writers didn’t spoonfeed us happy endings. We were in stitches one moment with Cam, Mitchell and Gloria in the hospital, watching the soap opera unfold, and in the next we were feeling their loss. We laughed and we cried in a 30-minute period. And that’s what good TV is all about."

Kristen Dyrr from Yahoo TV writes: "The "Modern Family" Season 3 finale episode "Baby on Board" is one of the best episodes of the show. The episode has it all. There are sad moments, happy moments, and twists and turns. Some of the laughs are hilarious and sad at the same time, others are both funny and creepy, and still others are cute and adorable. Every character is featured equally, so all preferences are covered. There is something for everyone."

Also, the storyline with the failed adoption of a second baby by Mitch and Cameron and the way the two actors played the scene of frustration and disappointment received positive feedback. "...Jesse Tyler Ferguson and Eric Stonestreet got to play maybe the strongest emotional material they've had in the show's run to date, and that made the episode a lot richer than we would have guessed [...] the reaction these two men had to the disappointment felt entirely earned. The scene was also maybe the purest expression of love Mitchell and Cam have ever shown one another - for all their Bickersons routine, this is an unquestionably committed couple, and it's nice to be shown that once in a while."

=== Accolades ===
Steven Levitan received an Emmy Award for Outstanding Directing for a Comedy Series for this episode. Ed O'Neill submitted this episode for consideration due to his nomination for the Primetime Emmy Award for Outstanding Supporting Actor in a Comedy Series at the 64th Primetime Emmy Awards.
