= 64th Primetime Emmy Awards =

2012 American television programming awards

- Promotional poster
- Date: September 23, 2012 (Ceremony); September 15, 2012 (Creative Arts Awards)
- Location: Nokia Theatre, Los Angeles, California, U.S.
- Presented by: Academy of Television Arts and Sciences
- Hosted by: Jimmy Kimmel

Highlights
- Most awards: Major: Game Change; Homeland; Modern Family (4); All: Game of Thrones (6)
- Most nominations: Downton Abbey; Modern Family; Mad Men (9)
- Outstanding Comedy Series: Modern Family
- Outstanding Drama Series: Homeland
- Outstanding Miniseries or Movie: Game Change
- Outstanding Reality-Competition Program: The Amazing Race
- Outstanding Variety Series: The Daily Show with Jon Stewart
- Website: http://www.emmys.com/

Television/radio coverage
- Network: ABC
- Produced by: Don Mischer
- Directed by: Glenn Weiss

The 64th Primetime Emmy Awards, honoring the best in prime time television programming from June 1, 2011, until May 31, 2012, were held on Sunday, September 23, 2012, at the Nokia Theatre in Downtown Los Angeles, California, where 26 awards were presented. ABC televised the ceremony in the United States. Comedian and ABC's late-night talk show host Jimmy Kimmel hosted the Primetime Emmys for the first time. Kimmel and Kerry Washington announced the nominations on July 19, 2012. Nick Offerman was originally scheduled to co-announce the nominations, but had to cancel due to travel delays. The Creative Arts Emmy Awards ceremony was held on September 15 and was televised on September 22, 2012, on ReelzChannel.

The award for Outstanding Drama Series went to Showtime crime drama Homeland, the first for that network, and which broke Mad Men's four-year hold on the award; while the Outstanding Comedy Series award went for the third year in a row to ABC's Modern Family. This was the first ceremony that none of the four major American broadcasting TV networks were nominated in the categories of Outstanding Drama Series, Outstanding Lead Actor in a Drama Series, and Outstanding Supporting Actor in a Drama Series. For Britain, the ceremony was noted for the successes of actors Damian Lewis of Homeland and Maggie Smith of Downton Abbey.

Of the latter, Dame Maggie not only was PBS' first win in her category, she had won the previous year, for the same role in another category. Hers was also the first win in a major acting category for a Drama Series for PBS since 1975.

Mad Men set a new record for the largest "shutout" in Emmy history, receiving nominations for 17 awards and winning none. This broke the previous record of 16 nominations without a win, set by Northern Exposure in 1993 and The Larry Sanders Show in 1997. This record was broken by The Handmaid's Tale in 2021, which did not win any of its 21 nominations that year.

== Winners and nominees ==
Winners are listed first and highlighted in bold:

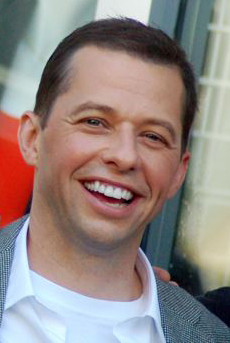
Jon Cryer, Outstanding Lead Actor in a Comedy Series winner

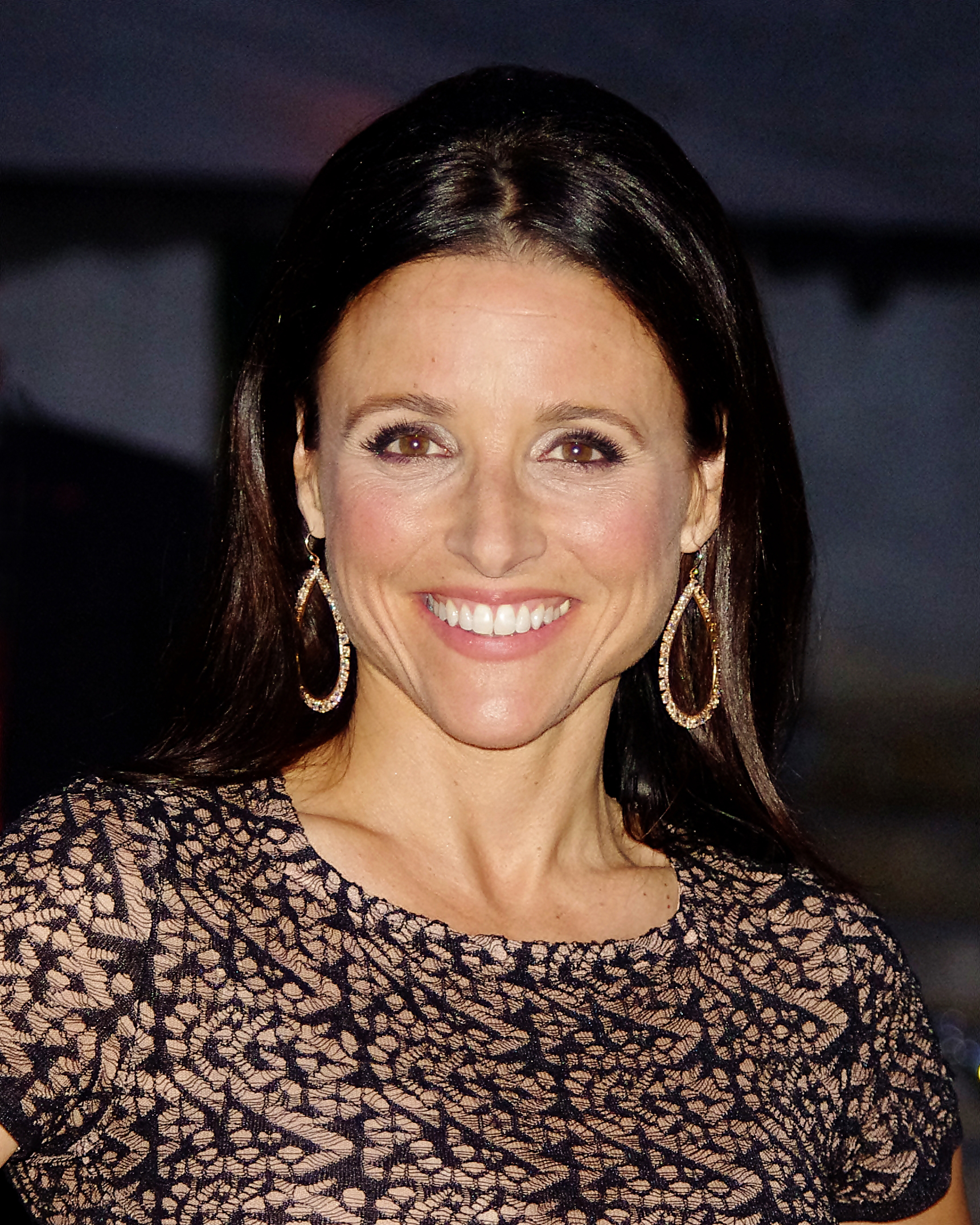
Julia Louis-Dreyfus, Outstanding Lead Actress in a Comedy Series winner

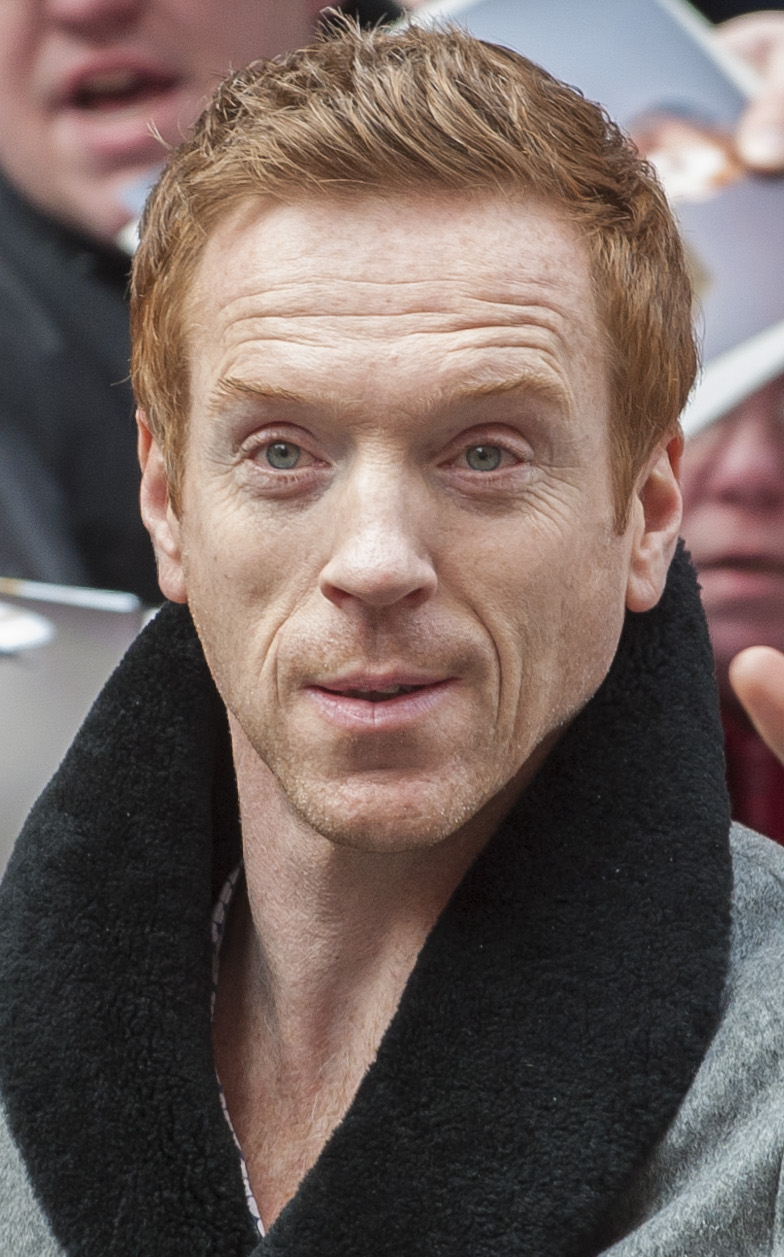
Damian Lewis, Outstanding Lead Actor in a Drama Series winner

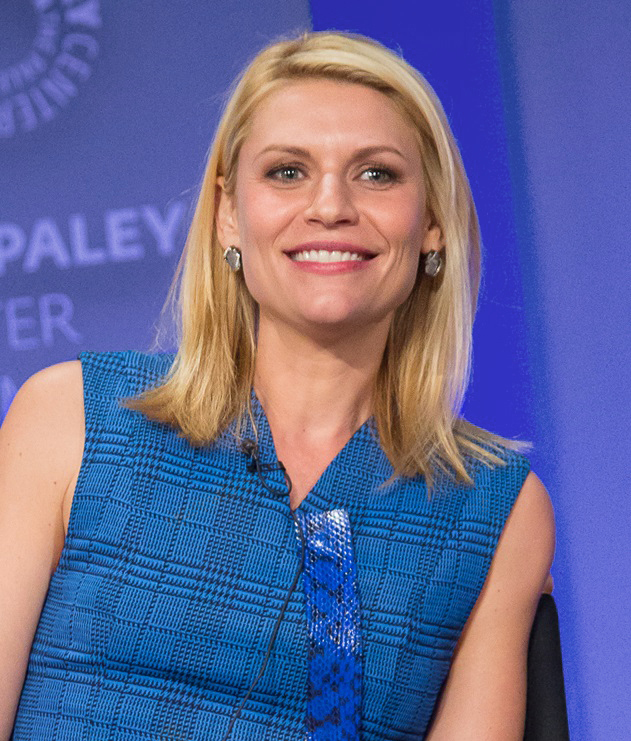
Claire Danes, Outstanding Lead Actress in a Drama Series winner

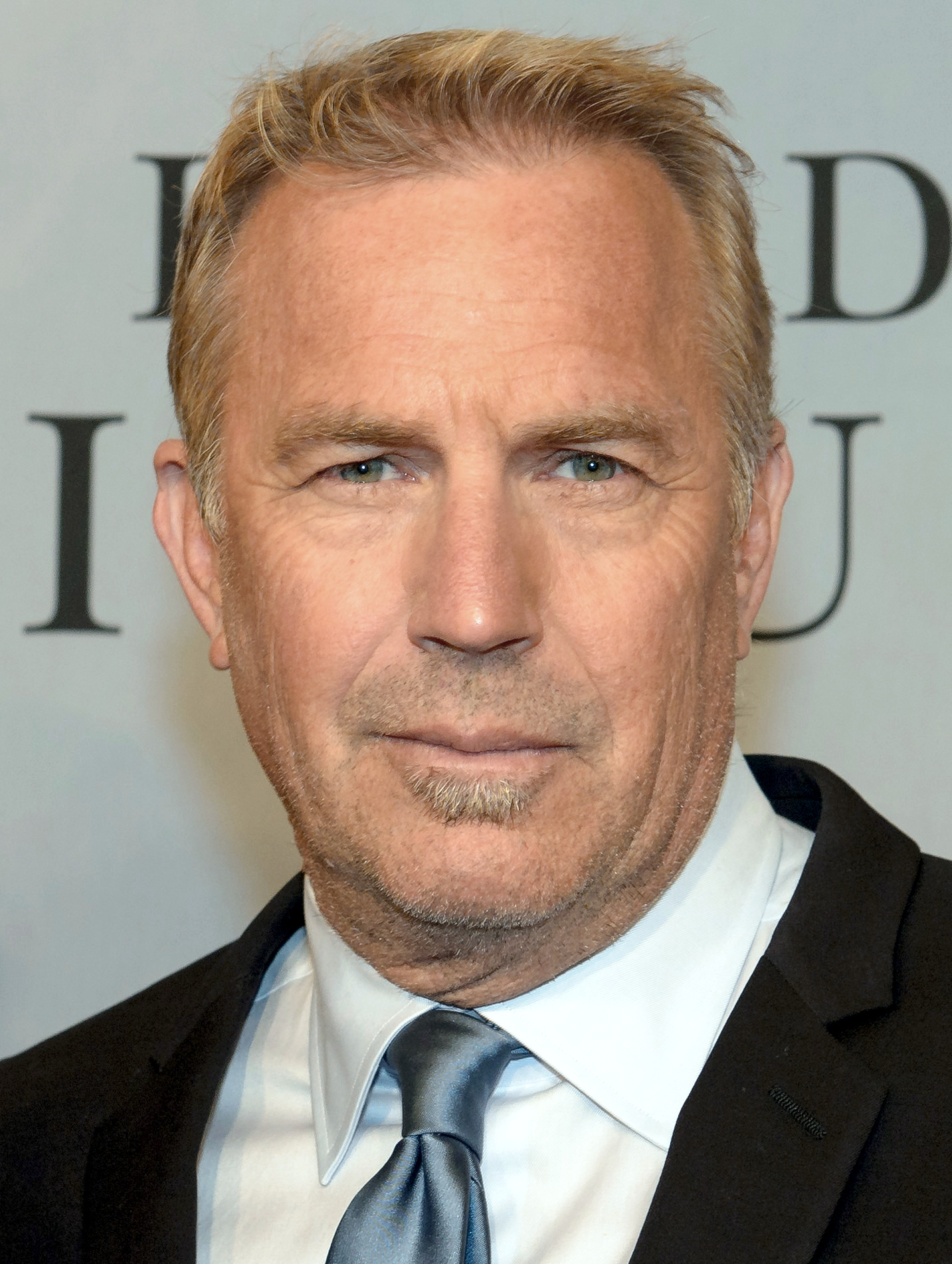
Kevin Costner, Outstanding Lead Actor in a Miniseries or Movie winner

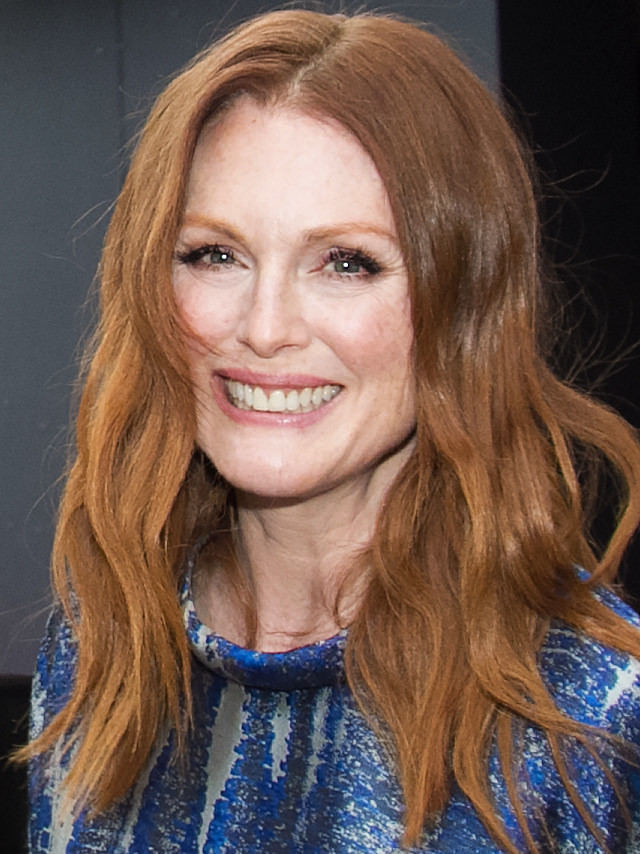
Julianne Moore, Outstanding Lead Actress in a Miniseries or Movie winner

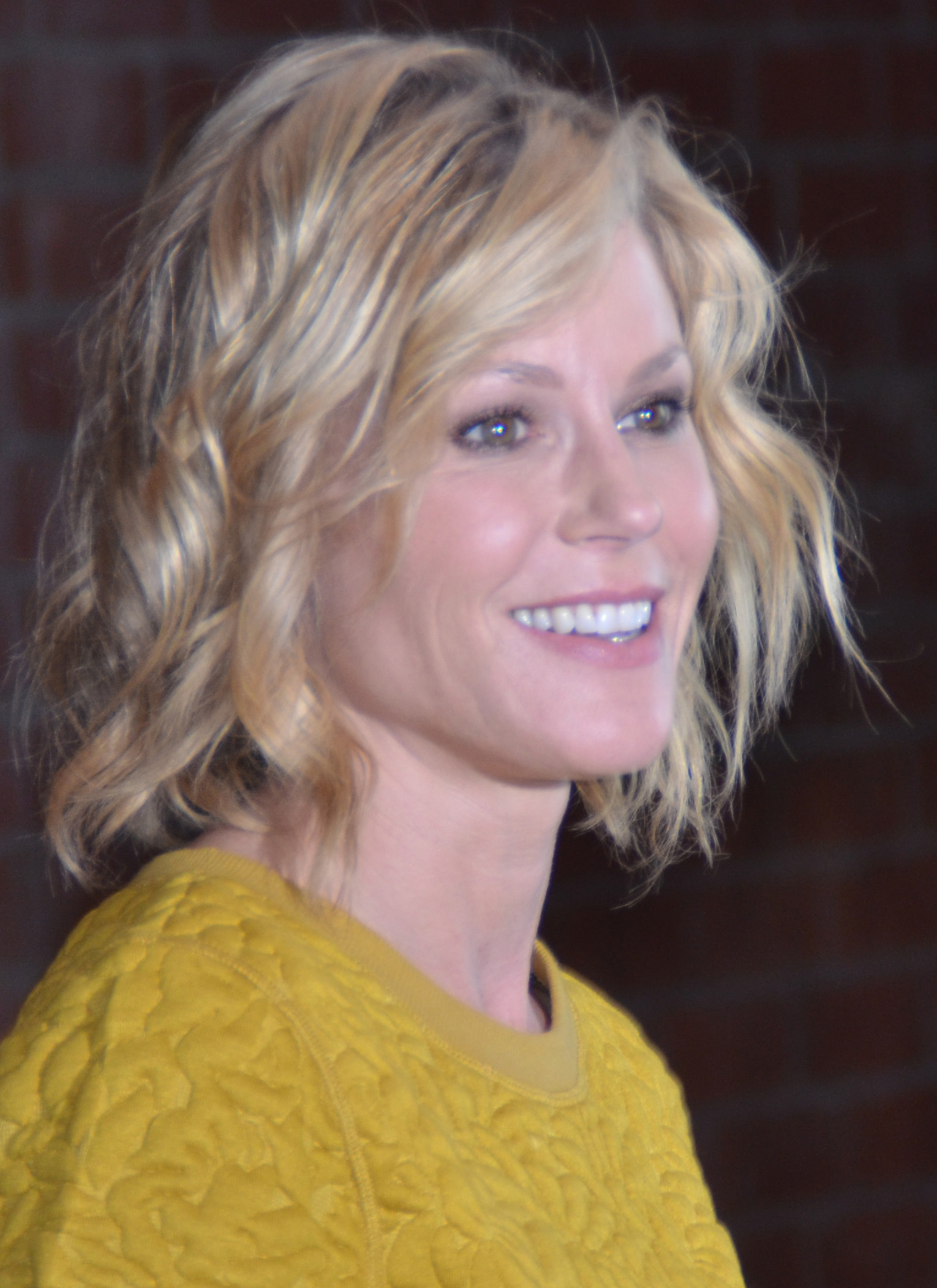
Julie Bowen, Outstanding Supporting Actress in a Comedy Series winner

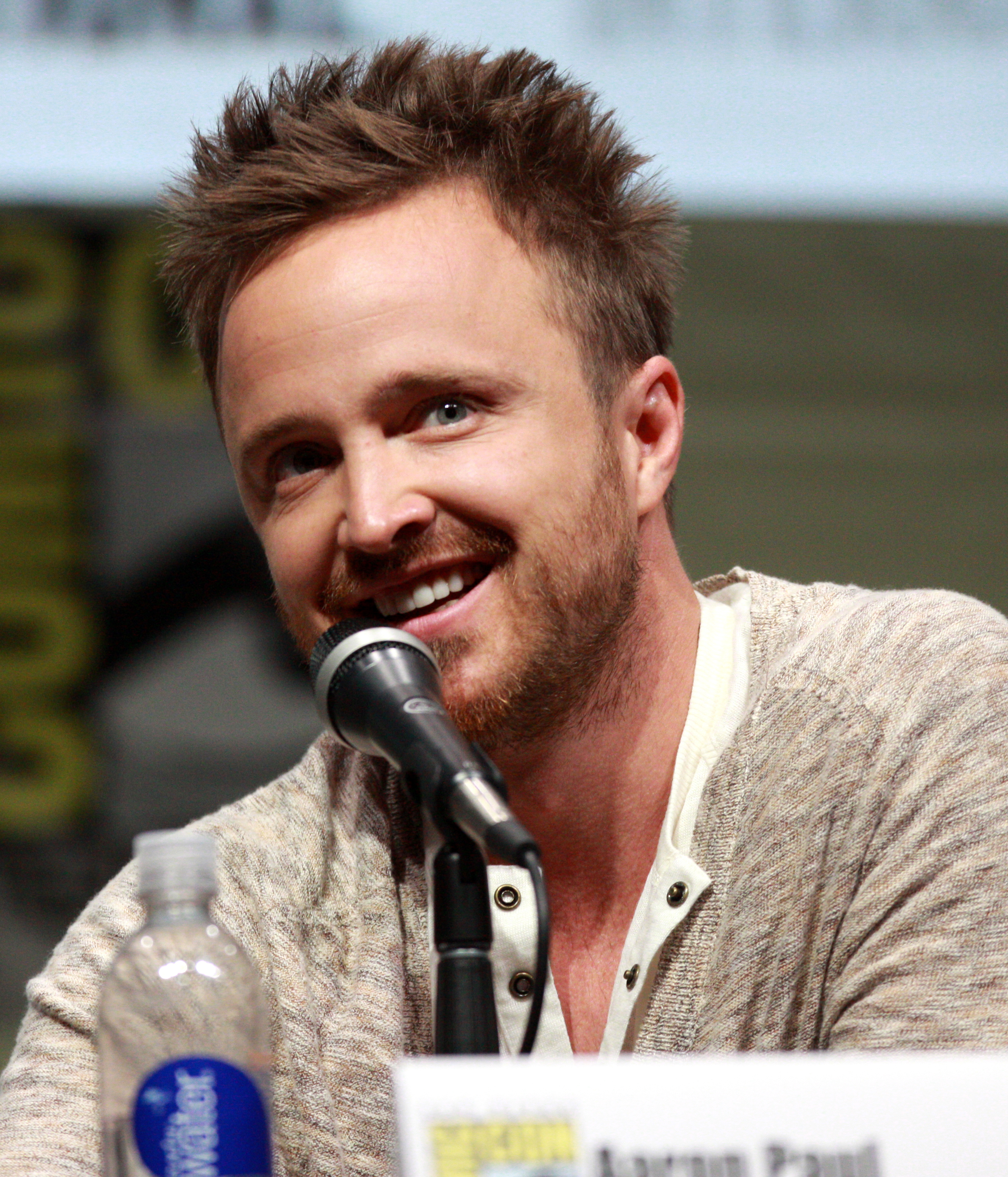
Aaron Paul, Outstanding Supporting Actor in a Drama Series winner

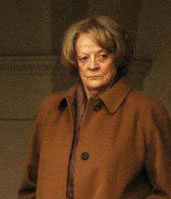
Maggie Smith, Outstanding Supporting Actress in a Drama Series winner

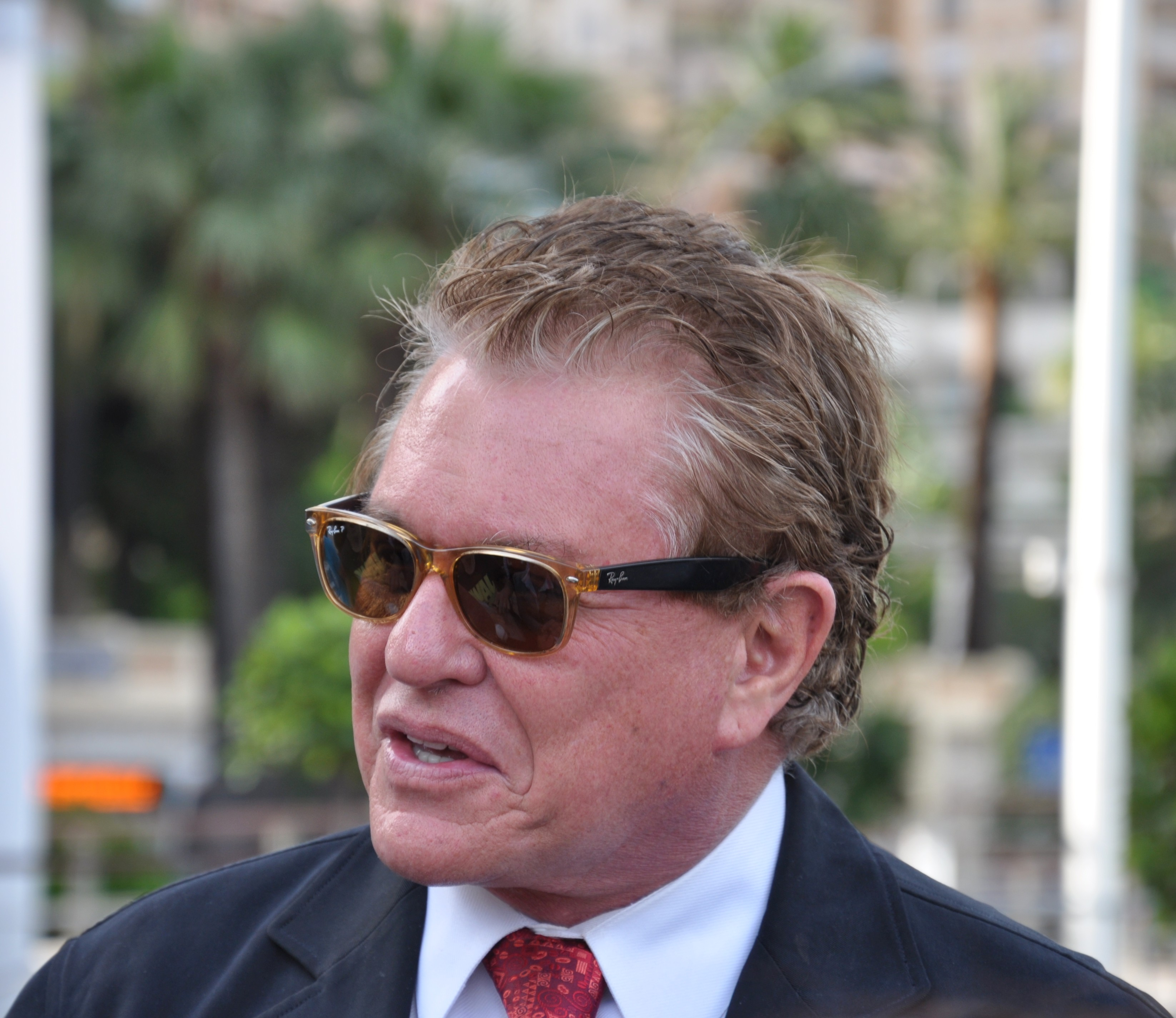
Tom Berenger, Outstanding Supporting Actor in a Miniseries or Movie winner

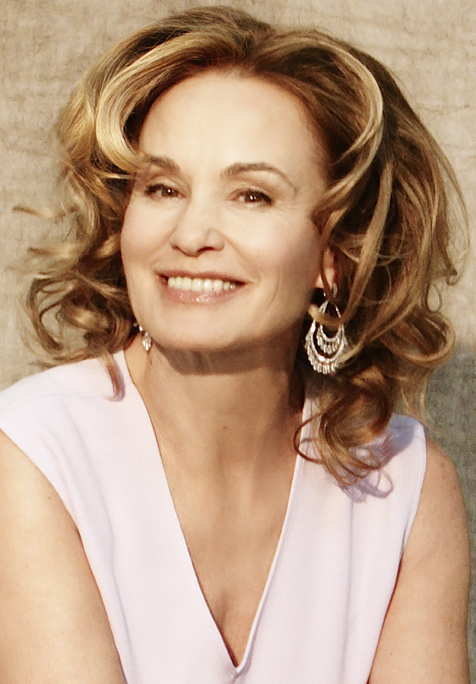
Jessica Lange, Outstanding Supporting Actress in a Miniseries or Movie winner

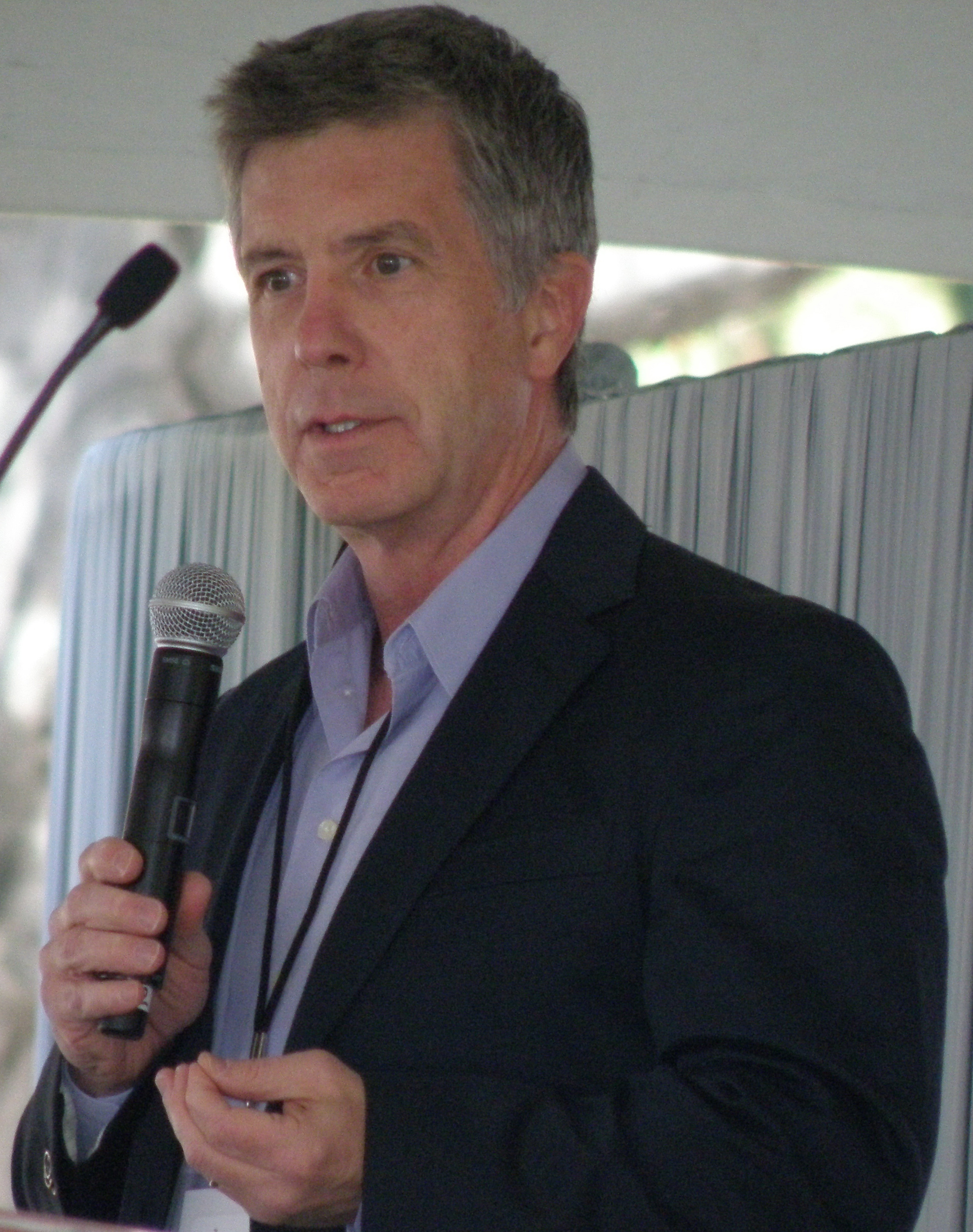
Tom Bergeron, Outstanding Host for a Reality or Reality-Competition Program winner

=== Programs ===
Programs
**Outstanding Comedy Series**: **Modern Family (ABC)**; 30 Rock (NBC); The Big Bang Theory (CBS); Curb Your Enthusiasm (HBO); Girls (HBO); Veep (HBO)	**Outstanding Drama Series**: **Homeland (Showtime)**; Boardwalk Empire (HBO); Breaking Bad (AMC); Downton Abbey (PBS); Game of Thrones (HBO); Mad Men (AMC)
**Outstanding Variety Series**: **The Daily Show with Jon Stewart (Comedy Central)**; The Colbert Report (Comedy Central); Jimmy Kimmel Live! (ABC); Late Night with Jimmy Fallon (NBC); Real Time with Bill Maher (HBO); Saturday Night Live (NBC)	**Outstanding Miniseries or Movie**: **Game Change (HBO)**; American Horror Story (FX); Hatfields & McCoys (History); Hemingway & Gellhorn (HBO); Luther (BBC America); Sherlock: A Scandal in Belgravia (PBS)
**Outstanding Reality-Competition Program**: **The Amazing Race (CBS)**; Dancing with the Stars (ABC); Project Runway (Lifetime); So You Think You Can Dance (Fox); Top Chef (Bravo); The Voice (NBC)

=== Acting ===
==== Lead performances ====
Lead performances
**Outstanding Lead Actor in a Comedy Series**: **Jon Cryer – Two and a Half Men as Dr. Alan Harper (CBS)**; Alec Baldwin – 30 Rock as Jack Donaghy (NBC); Louis C.K. – Louie as Louie (FX); Don Cheadle – House of Lies as Marty Kaan (Showtime); Larry David – Curb Your Enthusiasm as himself (HBO); Jim Parsons – The Big Bang Theory as Dr. Sheldon Cooper (CBS) (Episode: "The Werewolf Transformation")	**Outstanding Lead Actress in a Comedy Series**: **Julia Louis-Dreyfus on Veep as Vice President Selina Meyer (HBO)**; Zooey Deschanel – New Girl as Jessica Day (Fox); Lena Dunham – Girls as Hannah Horvath (HBO); Edie Falco – Nurse Jackie as Jackie Peyton, RN (Showtime); Tina Fey – 30 Rock as Liz Lemon (NBC); Melissa McCarthy – Mike & Molly as Molly Flynn (CBS); Amy Poehler – Parks and Recreation as Leslie Knope (NBC)
**Outstanding Lead Actor in a Drama Series**: **Damian Lewis – Homeland as Nicholas Brody (Showtime)**; Hugh Bonneville – Downton Abbey as Robert, Earl of Grantham (PBS); Steve Buscemi – Boardwalk Empire as Nucky Thompson (HBO); Bryan Cranston – Breaking Bad as Walter White (AMC); Michael C. Hall – Dexter as Dexter Morgan (Showtime); Jon Hamm – Mad Men as Don Draper (AMC)	**Outstanding Lead Actress in a Drama Series**: **Claire Danes – Homeland as Carrie Mathison (Showtime)**; Kathy Bates – Harry's Law as Harriet "Harry" Korn (NBC); Glenn Close – Damages as Patty Hewes (Audience Network); Michelle Dockery – Downton Abbey as Lady Mary Crawley (PBS); Julianna Margulies – The Good Wife as Alicia Florrick (CBS); Elisabeth Moss – Mad Men as Peggy Olson (AMC)
**Outstanding Lead Actor in a Miniseries or Movie**: **Kevin Costner – Hatfields & McCoys as Devil Anse Hatfield (History)**; Benedict Cumberbatch – Sherlock: A Scandal in Belgravia as Sherlock Holmes (PBS); Idris Elba – Luther as DCI John Luther (BBC America); Woody Harrelson – Game Change as Steve Schmidt (HBO); Clive Owen – Hemingway & Gellhorn as Ernest Hemingway (HBO); Bill Paxton – Hatfields & McCoys as Randolph McCoy (History)	**Outstanding Lead Actress in a Miniseries or Movie**: **Julianne Moore – Game Change as Sarah Palin (HBO)**; Connie Britton – American Horror Story as Vivien Harmon (FX); Ashley Judd – Missing as Rebecca Winstone (ABC); Nicole Kidman – Hemingway & Gellhorn as Martha Gellhorn (HBO); Emma Thompson – The Song of Lunch as She (PBS)

==== Supporting performances ====
Supporting performances
**Outstanding Supporting Actor in a Comedy Series**: **Eric Stonestreet – Modern Family as Cameron Tucker (ABC) (Episode: "Treehouse")**; Ty Burrell – Modern Family as Phil Dunphy (ABC) (Episode: "Lifetime Supply"); Jesse Tyler Ferguson – Modern Family as Mitchell Pritchett (ABC) (Episode: "Leap Day"); Max Greenfield – New Girl as Schmidt (Fox); Bill Hader – Saturday Night Live as various characters (NBC); Ed O'Neill – Modern Family as Jay Pritchett (ABC) (Episode: "Baby on Board")	**Outstanding Supporting Actress in a Comedy Series**: **Julie Bowen – Modern Family as Claire Dunphy (ABC) (Episode: "Go Bullfrogs!")**; Mayim Bialik – The Big Bang Theory as Dr. Amy Farrah Fowler (CBS) (Episode: "The Shiny Trinket Maneuver"); Kathryn Joosten – Desperate Housewives as Karen McCluskey (ABC) (Episodes: "Give Me the Blame" and "Finishing the Hat"); Sofía Vergara – Modern Family as Gloria Delgado-Pritchett (ABC) (Episode: "Tableau Vivant"); Merritt Wever – Nurse Jackie as Zoey Barkow, RN (Showtime); Kristen Wiig – Saturday Night Live as various characters (NBC)
**Outstanding Supporting Actor in a Drama Series**: **Aaron Paul – Breaking Bad as Jesse Pinkman (AMC)**; Jim Carter – Downton Abbey as Charles Carson (PBS); Brendan Coyle – Downton Abbey as John Bates (PBS); Peter Dinklage – Game of Thrones as Tyrion Lannister (HBO); Giancarlo Esposito – Breaking Bad as Gus Fring (AMC); Jared Harris – Mad Men as Lane Pryce (AMC)	**Outstanding Supporting Actress in a Drama Series**: **Maggie Smith – Downton Abbey as Violet Crawley, Dowager Countess of Grantham (PBS)**; Christine Baranski – The Good Wife as Diane Lockhart (CBS); Joanne Froggatt – Downton Abbey as Anna Bates (PBS); Anna Gunn – Breaking Bad as Skyler White (AMC); Christina Hendricks – Mad Men as Joan Harris (AMC); Archie Panjabi – The Good Wife as Kalinda Sharma (CBS)
**Outstanding Supporting Actor in a Miniseries or Movie**: **Tom Berenger – Hatfields & McCoys as Jim Vance (History)**; Martin Freeman – Sherlock: A Scandal in Belgravia as Dr. John Watson (PBS); Ed Harris – Game Change as John McCain (HBO); Denis O'Hare – American Horror Story as Larry Harvey (FX); David Strathairn – Hemingway & Gellhorn as John Dos Passos (HBO)	**Outstanding Supporting Actress in a Miniseries or Movie**: **Jessica Lange – American Horror Story as Constance Langdon (FX)**; Frances Conroy – American Horror Story as Moira O'Hara (FX); Judy Davis – Page Eight as Jill Tankard (PBS); Sarah Paulson – Game Change as Nicolle Wallace (HBO); Mare Winningham – Hatfields & McCoys as Sally McCoy (History)

=== Hosting ===
Hosting
**Outstanding Host for a Reality or Reality-Competition Program**
- **Tom Bergeron – Dancing with the Stars (ABC)**
  - Cat Deeley – So You Think You Can Dance (Fox)
  - Phil Keoghan – The Amazing Race (CBS)
  - Ryan Seacrest – American Idol (Fox)
  - Betty White – Betty White's Off Their Rockers (NBC)

=== Directing ===
Directing
**Outstanding Directing for a Comedy Series**: **Modern Family: "Baby on Board" – Steven Levitan (ABC)**; Curb Your Enthusiasm: "Palestinian Chicken" – Robert B. Weide (HBO); Girls: "She Did" – Lena Dunham (HBO); Louie: "Duckling" – Louis C.K. (FX); Modern Family: "Virgin Territory" – Jason Winer (ABC); New Girl: "Pilot" – Jake Kasdan (Fox)	**Outstanding Directing for a Drama Series**: **Boardwalk Empire: "To the Lost" – Tim Van Patten (HBO)**; Breaking Bad: "Face Off" – Vince Gilligan (AMC); Downton Abbey: "Episode Seven" – Brian Percival (PBS); Homeland: "Pilot" – Michael Cuesta (Showtime); Mad Men: "The Other Woman" – Phil Abraham (AMC)
**Outstanding Directing for a Variety Special**: **65th Tony Awards – Glenn Weiss (CBS)**; 84th Academy Awards – Don Mischer (ABC); 54th Grammy Awards – Louis J. Horvitz (CBS); Louis C.K.: Live at the Beacon Theater – Louis C.K. (FX); New York City Ballet: George Balanchine's The Nutcracker (Live from Lincoln Center) – Alan Skog (PBS)	**Outstanding Directing for a Miniseries, Movie or Dramatic Special**: **Game Change – Jay Roach (HBO)**; Hatfields & McCoys – Kevin Reynolds (History); Hemingway & Gellhorn – Philip Kaufman (HBO); Luther – Sam Miller (BBC America); Sherlock: A Scandal in Belgravia – Paul McGuigan (PBS)

=== Writing ===
Writing
**Outstanding Writing for a Comedy Series**: **Louie: "Pregnant" – Louis C.K. (FX)**; Community: "Remedial Chaos Theory" – Chris McKenna (NBC); Girls: "Pilot" – Lena Dunham (HBO); Parks and Recreation: "The Debate" – Amy Poehler (NBC); Parks and Recreation: "Win, Lose, or Draw" – Michael Schur (NBC)	**Outstanding Writing for a Drama Series**: **Homeland: "Pilot" – Alex Gansa, Howard Gordon, and Gideon Raff (Showtime)**; Downton Abbey: "Episode Seven" – Julian Fellowes (PBS); Mad Men: "Commissions and Fees" – Andre Jacquemetton and Maria Jacquemetton (AMC); Mad Men: "Far Away Places" – Semi Chellas and Matthew Weiner (AMC); Mad Men: "The Other Woman" – Semi Chellas and Matthew Weiner (AMC)
**Outstanding Writing for a Variety Special**: **Louis C.K.: Live at the Beacon Theater – Louis C.K. (FX)**; 84th Academy Awards (ABC); Betty White's 90th Birthday: A Tribute to America's Golden Girl (NBC); Kennedy Center Honors (CBS); 65th Tony Awards (CBS)	**Outstanding Writing for a Miniseries, Movie or Dramatic Special**: **Game Change – Danny Strong (HBO)**; Hatfields & McCoys – Bill Kerby, Ted Mann, and Ronald Parker (History); The Hour – Abi Morgan (BBC America); Luther – Neil Cross (BBC America); Sherlock: A Scandal in Belgravia – Steven Moffat (PBS)

== Most major nominations ==
Networks with multiple major nominations (Note: "Major" constitutes the categories listed above: Program, Acting, Directing, and Writing. Does not include the technical categories.)
Network	No. of Nominations
HBO	27
PBS	17
ABC	16
AMC	15
NBC	15
CBS	14
Showtime	9

Programs with multiple major nominations
Program	Category	Network	No. of Nominations
Downton Abbey	Drama	PBS	9
Modern Family	Comedy	ABC	9
Mad Men	Drama	AMC	9
Game Change	Movie	HBO	7
Hatfields & McCoys	Miniseries	History	7
Breaking Bad	Drama	AMC	6
Homeland	Drama	Showtime	5
American Horror Story	Miniseries	FX	5
Hemingway & Gellhorn	Movie	HBO	5
Sherlock: A Scandal in Belgravia	Movie	PBS	5
Girls	Comedy	HBO	4
Luther	Miniseries	BBC America	4
30 Rock	Comedy	NBC	3
The Big Bang Theory	Comedy	CBS	3
Boardwalk Empire	Drama	HBO	3
Curb Your Enthusiasm	Comedy	HBO	3
The Good Wife	Drama	CBS	3
Louie	Comedy	FX	3
New Girl	Comedy	Fox	3
Parks and Recreation	Comedy	NBC	3
Saturday Night Live	Variety	NBC	3
65th Tony Awards	Variety	CBS	2
84th Academy Awards	Variety	ABC	2
The Amazing Race	Competition	CBS	2
Dancing with the Stars	Competition	ABC	2
Game of Thrones	Drama	HBO	2
Louis C.K.: Live at the Beacon Theater	Variety	FX	2
Nurse Jackie	Comedy	Showtime	2
So You Think You Can Dance	Competition	Fox	2
Veep	Comedy	HBO	2

== Most major awards ==
Networks with multiple major awards
Network	No. of Awards
HBO	6
ABC	5
Showtime	4
CBS	3
FX	3
History	2

Programs with multiple major awards
Program	Category	Network	No. of Awards
Game Change	Movie	HBO	4
Homeland	Drama	Showtime	4
Modern Family	Comedy	ABC	4
Hatfields & McCoys	Miniseries	History	2

== Presenters ==
The awards were presented by the following:

Name(s)	Role
Louis C.K. Amy Poehler	Presenters of the award for Outstanding Supporting Actor in a Comedy Series
Zooey Deschanel; Jim Parsons	Presenters of the award for Outstanding Writing for a Comedy Series
Jon Cryer; Kat Dennings	Presenters of the award for Outstanding Supporting Actress in a Comedy Series
Matthew Perry	Introducer of Outstanding Guest Actor in a Comedy Series winner Jimmy Fallon and Outstanding Guest Actress in a Comedy Series winner Kathy Bates
Kathy Bates; Jimmy Fallon	Presenters of the award for Outstanding Directing for a Comedy Series
Mindy Kaling; Melissa McCarthy	Presenters of the award for Outstanding Lead Actor in a Comedy Series
Stephen Colbert	Presenter of the award for Outstanding Lead Actress in a Comedy Series
James Van Der Beek; Damon Wayans Jr.	Presenters of the award for Outstanding Reality-Competition Program
Seth MacFarlane	Presenter of the award for Outstanding Host for a Reality or Reality-Competition Program
Claire Danes	Presenter of the award for Outstanding Supporting Actor in a Drama Series
Connie Britton; Hayden Panettiere	Presenters of the awards for Outstanding Writing for a Drama Series and Outstanding Supporting Actress in a Drama Series
Giancarlo Esposito	Introducer of Outstanding Guest Actor in a Drama Series winner Jeremy Davies and Outstanding Guest Actress in a Drama Series winner Martha Plimpton
Jeremy Davies; Martha Plimpton	Presenters of the award for Outstanding Directing for a Drama Series
Julianna Margulies; Dylan McDermott	Presenters of the award for Outstanding Lead Actor in a Drama Series
Tina Fey; Jon Hamm	Presenter of the award for Outstanding Lead Actress in a Drama Series
Aziz Ansari; Jane Levy	Presenters of the award for Outstanding Writing for a Variety Special
Ricky Gervais	Presenter of the awards for Outstanding Directing for a Variety Special and Outstanding Variety Series
Steve Buscemi	Presenter of the award for Outstanding Supporting Actress in a Miniseries or Movie
Kerry Washington	Presenter of the award for Outstanding Supporting Actor in a Miniseries or Movie
Lucy Liu; Kiefer Sutherland	Presenters of the awards for Outstanding Writing for a Miniseries, Movie or Dramatic Special and Outstanding Lead Actress in a Miniseries or Movie
Ginnifer Goodwin; Emily Van Camp	Presenters of the awards for Outstanding Directing for a Miniseries, Movie or Dramatic Special and Outstanding Lead Actor in a Miniseries or Movie
Andre Braugher	Presenter of the award for Outstanding Miniseries or Movie
Julianne Moore	Presenter of the award for Outstanding Drama Series
Michael J. Fox	Presenter of the award for Outstanding Comedy Series

== In Memoriam ==
Before the recorded segment, Ron Howard presented a tribute to Andy Griffith.

The people tributed in the segment included:

- Marvin Hamlisch
- Davy Jones
- Hal Kanter
- Richard Dawson
- Jim Paratore
- Lee Rich
- Sherman Hemsley
- Phyllis Diller
- William Asher
- Celeste Holm
- Michael Clarke Duncan
- Lupe Ontiveros
- James Farentino
- Irving Fein
- Heavy D
- Chad Everett
- Don Cornelius
- Robert Hegyes
- Ron Palillo
- Robert Easton
- Andy Rooney
- John Rich
- Michele O'Callaghan
- Steve Jobs
- Gil Cates
- Bob Henry
- Al Freeman Jr.
- Patrice O'Neal
- Whitney Houston
- Ben Gazzara
- Donna Summer
- Tony Scott
- Kathryn Joosten
- Paul Bogart
- William Windom
- Norman Felton
- Frank Pierson
- Mike Wallace
- Ernest Borgnine
- Harry Morgan
- Dick Clark

== Televised ceremony ratings ==
The ceremony, which was televised by ABC on September 23, 2012, was watched by 13.26 million viewers. The event's red carpet proceedings were watched by 5.63 million.
