= Punkin Chunkin (Modern Family) =

- Modern Family episode
- Cam (Eric Stonestreet) trying to prove his story is true while the whole family's watching.
- Episode no.: Season 3 Episode 9
- Directed by: Michael Spiller
- Written by: Ben Karlin
- Production code: 3ARG05
- Original air date: November 23, 2011

Guest appearance
- Josh Gad as Kenneth

Episode chronology
← Previous "After the Fire"	Next → "Express Christmas"
- Modern Family season 3

"Punkin Chunkin" is the ninth episode of the third season of the American sitcom Modern Family, and the series' 57th episode overall. It aired on November 23, 2011. The episode was written by Ben Karlin and directed by Michael Spiller.

In the episode, a former kid neighbor of the Dunphys, who never attended college but is now a billionaire, visits, which creates tension in the family since Haley now claims that going to college isn't the only way to follow your dreams, while Phil blames Claire for holding him back from his dreams. Jay tries to give Manny constructive criticism but Gloria does not understand why they should tell Manny negative things. Mitchell questions the authenticity of Cameron's stories and challenges him to prove that his stories are true.

"Punkin Chunkin" received mixed reviews from critics.

== Plot ==
As Thanksgiving approaches, the Dunphys receive a visit from their former kid neighbor Kenneth (Josh Gad) who idolized Phil (Ty Burrell). Kenneth tells the family that he dropped out of college and is now a billionaire because of an investment company he started with a friend, something that he owes to Phil since he was the one who was always telling him to follow his heart and told himself to 'think like Phil' when making decisions. Haley (Sarah Hyland) takes the opportunity to say that it is not so bad not to go to college and follow your dreams instead, which upsets Claire (Julie Bowen). Phil starts to wonder why he isn't as successful as Kenneth and believes that Claire pouring scorn onto his various ideas is what held him back. Haley and Alex go out for a drive, but Alex distracts Haley and she accidentally runs the car into a stone trash can. The two then do everything they can to keep Claire from noticing until she goes to the store (guessing that she'll assume someone hit her car in the lot).

Meanwhile, at the Pritchett-Delgado home, Jay (Ed O'Neill) tries to give Manny (Rico Rodriguez) a little constructive criticism in regards to a messy-looking centerpiece he made, but Gloria (Sofía Vergara) stops him because she does not want to hurt Manny's feelings. Jay tries to explain that it is not bad to tell Manny that he is not perfect, but she does not understand.

Cameron (Eric Stonestreet) and Mitch (Jesse Tyler Ferguson) are out with friends and Cameron tells a story of when he used a catapult to launch a pumpkin across a football field. Mitchell, who is tired of the story, tells Cameron he doesn't believe it and questions the authenticity of it and several other stories he tells. Cameron, offended, insists that all of his stories are true, but he struggles to make Mitch believe them.

The whole family gathers at the Dunphy's house, where Jay takes the chance to tell Manny his centerpiece isn't that good. Manny throws it in the trash, leading to an argument over all three issues and dividing the family into the "Dreamers" (Cameron, Phil and Gloria) and the "Realists" (Jay, Mitchell and Claire). The arguments ends up leading them to a football field so Cameron can prove that his story with the punkin chunkin is true.

At the field, they build a catapult and shoot a pumpkin from it, but it doesn't travel very far, seemingly disproving Cameron's story. The Realists don't get the satisfaction they thought they would and instead tell the others they want to try again but this time with the pumpkin shot from a steeper angle with more people pulling at it. The second time, it works. As the pumpkin sails through the air, a guilt-ridden Alex confesses to Claire what happened to the car just before the pumpkin hits the dent they made.

== Reception ==
=== Ratings ===
In its original American broadcast "Punkin Chunkin" was watched by 12.72 million; slightly down from the previous episode.

=== Reviews ===
"Punkin Chunkin" received mixed reviews.

Claire Zulkey from The A.V. Club gave a B+ rate to the episode saying that "...the show didn’t go anywhere new tonight but it was good entertainment for the night before Thanksgiving."

Leigh Raines of TV Fanatic gave the episode a 3/5 rate stating that this week's episode was "just depressing".

Maris Kreizman from Vulture gave a good review to the episode saying: " The push and pull between the three main couples has always been the show’s lifeblood. If revisiting this dynamic sometimes comes at the detriment of plot and character development, well, at least it’s good for laughs."
