= Express Christmas =

- Modern Family episode
- Phil (Ty Burrell) comes up with the idea of "Express Christmas"
- Episode no.: Season 3 Episode 10
- Directed by: Michael Spiller
- Written by: Cindy Chupack
- Production code: 3ARG10
- Original air date: December 7, 2011

Episode chronology
← Previous "Punkin Chunkin"	Next → "Lifetime Supply"
- Modern Family season 3

"Express Christmas" is the tenth episode of the third season of the American sitcom Modern Family, and the series' 58th episode overall. It was aired on December 7, 2011. The episode was written by Cindy Chupack and directed by Michael Spiller. Express Christmas is the second Christmas episode of the series.

In the episode, while the entire family is together on December 16, they suddenly realize that circumstances will prevent them from being together for Christmas Day on December 25. Phil instantly comes up with a plan: members of the family are paired up and challenged to work together on specific assignments to obtain an object or perform a task that afternoon so that a makeshift emergency ('Express') Christmas, to be held that evening, will seem just like a "Traditional Christmas." Each of the missions ends in disaster - but in their pursuits, the family is brought closer together as a result.

The episode received positive reviews.

== Plot ==
The episode starts with the whole family lounging around Jay (Ed O'Neill) and Gloria's (Sofía Vergara) pool. Mitchell (Jesse Tyler Ferguson) announces that their mother canceled for Christmas because she will go for a cruise with her new boyfriend. Claire (Julie Bowen) is also upset with the cancellation, not because she will miss her, but because she did not even know about her mother having a boyfriend. Mitchell points out that their mother had previously mentioned him in a Christmas Family Newsletter, which Claire finds impossible to read. Discussion continues between family members regarding everyone's plans: Jay notes that on the day of Christmas he, Gloria and Manny (Rico Rodriguez) will be traveling to Mexico. The family realizes that this day (December 16) will be the last time the whole family will be together before New Year. Phil (Ty Burrell) has the idea of them celebrating Christmas that day, names it "Express Christmas," and enthusiastically attempts to get the rest of the family behind the idea.

Everyone gathers indoors as Phil, who is excitedly looking forward to this challenge, gets all the family members into groups so that everyone has something to do and get everything ready for their Christmas Day. Mitchell and Alex (Ariel Winter) go for a tree along with Lily (Aubrey Anderson-Emmons); Phil and Manny go to the grocery store; Jay and Cameron (Eric Stonestreet) are responsible for wrapping the gifts; Claire and Haley (Sarah Hyland) go to the store to buy the last minute gifts and Gloria with Luke (Nolan Gould) need to find the Christmas angel for the tree and the ornaments that are packed in the house's attic.

Mitchell and Alex, with Lily in tow, search for the perfect tree - an 8' tall Douglas Fir - in an urban tree lot. A tree salesman who has been watching them, tells them he thinks where they could find what they are looking for. They mistakenly think that he is pointing them to a group of artificial pink trees. Alex, immediately standing up for her uncle, tells the salesman that just because he is "clearly" gay does not mean they have to buy a pink tree. The salesman states he was talking about the truck pulling in behind those trees, which were loaded with 8' tall Douglas Firs. Being clearly embarrassed by their overreaction, but seeming to want to hold on to their dignity at the same time, they buy another tree they had previously dubbed unsuitable and load it onto the car, even offering to load it onto the car themselves. As a result of this, the tree falls off the rack and into traffic, where Gloria and Luke just happen to be passing that moment, and run over the tree destroying it. After some hopeful quips between Mitchell and Alex of salvaging the tree, a truck following Gloria's car destroys what was left of it. Instead of stopping, Gloria speeds on ahead, instructing Luke to never look back.

Gloria and Luke have to find the Christmas ornaments but Gloria is afraid to get into the attic because there are many spiders in there. They manage to find everything they are looking for, including the angel Mitchell and Claire want that their mother made for them when they were kids. On their way home, Gloria sees a spider on the angel and she throws it out of the car. The angel gets run over just like the tree and it breaks. Gloria "glues" the head back with chewed gum but Mitchell notices.

Claire and Haley are at the store to buy the gifts. They find everything they have on their list, except the nightlight for Lily. While Claire is heading to the register, Haley goes to find the nightlight. She gets there but there is only one left and it is taken by another man. Haley, to get it from him, she dressed up like an employee and she offers to bring his items to the register while he shops. She gets to Claire with the nightlight and they now have everything they wanted.

Cameron and Jay wrap the presents and while they do it, Cameron tries to have an emotional moment with Jay. He gives him a present and when Jay opens it, there is a cork in the box. Cameron tells Jay that it is from a moment they drank wine together but Jay does not remember which one. Cameron gets all teary and explains Jay that it was from the time they watched their first football game together. Jay offends Cameron that he is too attached to things and Cameron leaves the room.

Phil and Manny finish with the groceries and they now wait to meet with a guy at the parking lot, having arranged to buy a rare baseball card (a gift for Jay) on Craigslist. Manny though freaks out with the whole situation (Luke convinced him that child-snatching is very common) and he just wants to go back home. The guy gets there and while he tries to get a higher price from Phil, Manny whips out his mom's stun gun but he accidentally zaps Phil. The guy takes the money and the turkey Phil bought for the dinner, however Phil's hand goes into spasms and he ends up crushing the card.

The family finally gathers back together at Phil and Claire's home; the tree is in pieces; the angel is ruined; Claire does not have a turkey to cook and Phil is still vibrating after Manny zapped him with the stun gun. Everyone is disappointed and angry with each other since nothing has gone right so Jay makes a proposition; instead of celebrating Christmas they could all go to a Chinese restaurant and celebrate Jewish Christmas. Everyone agrees, desperate to put the disaster behind them, however when they get outside they find that Jay has covered the whole front of the house with fake snow. The arguments and problems are forgotten and the family has a wonderful early Christmas, and Gloria says in her interview that as long as you have family around you every day can be December 16.

Afterwards, Phil gives Jay his back-up present; dog antlers for Stella (which he picked up at a gas station). Although Phil doesn't expect much of a reaction, Jay loves them.

== Reception ==
=== Ratings ===
In its original American broadcast, "Express Christmas" was watched by 12.20 million; down from the special Thanksgiving episode.

=== Reviews ===
"Express Christmas" received positive reviews.

Leigh Raines from TV Fanatic rated the episode with 4/5. "My two favorite parts of the episode, not counting the tear-inducing snow scene, were Phil's explanation of Craigslist's shadiness before Manny tasered him and Haley working her magic at Target."

Christine N. Ziemba from Paste Magazine gave the episode 7/10 saying that "The new dynamics between characters were refreshing, even if some of the storylines fell flat."

The review from Wetpaint was really good. ""Express Christmas," had everything with love about Modern Family: plenty of jokes, mishaps, Phil-isms, Gloria mispronounciations, bickering, and heartwarming good cheer."

Despite these positive reviews, Noel Murray of The A.V. Club rated the episode a C−.
