= Amy Anderson (comedian) =

American comedian, actress, and writer (born 1972)

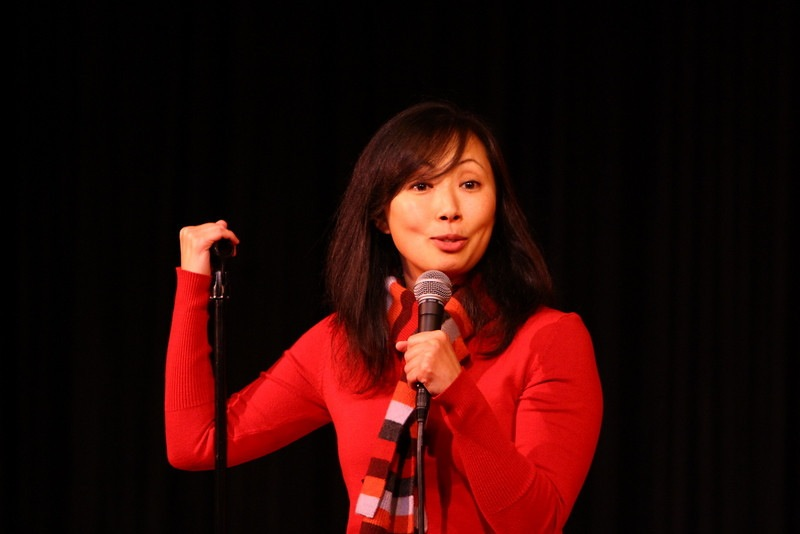
- Anderson performing in 2010
- Born: September 1, 1972 (age 54); Seoul, South Korea
- Education: Westminster Choir College
- Children: Aubrey Anderson-Emmons

Comedy career
- Years active: 2003–present
- Medium: Stand-up comedian; Actor; Writer; Singer
- Website: amyanderson.net

Amy Anderson (born September 1, 1972) is an American comedian, actor, and writer. A classically-trained musician, she has been singing and playing the piano and guitar for many years, earning her bachelor's degree in Music Education from Westminster Choir College. Upon completing college her career took a different direction, with Anderson working in a variety of positions – including supervising a coffee shop, working with adults with autism, and owning a pet care business. Eventually she chose to move into comedy and acting, and performed in the Fresh Ink series at Illusion Theater and other places. She currently resides in Southern California, where she is a working actor and comedian.

Many of Anderson's jokes deal with motherhood, racism, and being adopted. She produced the monthly ChopSchtick Comedy show at the Hollywood Laugh Factory and the Hollywood Improv, the first ever all-Asian American stand-up comedy showcase in the United States.

== Personal life ==
She was born in Seoul, South Korea, and adopted as an infant by American parents and raised in suburban Minnesota.

Anderson is the mother of child actor Aubrey Anderson-Emmons, who played Lily Tucker-Pritchett on ABC's Modern Family. Amy has a YouTube channel with daughter Aubrey called FoodManiaReview.

== Filmography ==
Films
| Year | Title | Role | Notes |
|---|---|---|---|
| 2019 | Blush | Exhausted Angel | |
| 2021 | Sweet & Sour | | English Dubbing |

Television
| Year | Title | Role | Notes |
|---|---|---|---|
| 2013 | Modern Family | Waitress | Guest role |
| 2013 | The Newsroom | Bethany Lee | 1 episode |
| 2013 | Raising Hope | Kelly | 1 episode |
| 2018 | The Bold and the Beautiful | Asian CEO | 1 episode |
| 2019 | Lucifer | Eleanor Basich | 1 episode |
| 2019 | American Princess | Lily | 1 episode |
| 2019 | Silicon Valley | Ms. Shizaki | 1 episode |
| 2020 | The Politician | Scientist | 1 episode |
| 2020 | Don't Look Deeper | Linda | 1 episode |
| 2022 | All Rise | Pamela Reed | 1 episode |
| 2022 | First Love | | English dubbing - 8 episodes |
| 2022 | Soundtrack 1 | | English dubbing - 4 episodes |
