= Virgin Territory (Modern Family) =

- Modern Family episode
- Episode no.: Season 3 Episode 16
- Directed by: Jason Winer
- Written by: Elaine Ko
- Production code: 3ARG17
- Original air date: February 22, 2012

Guest appearances
- Ernie Hudson as Miles; Hollis Robinson as Miranda; Will Greenberg as Dr. Goodall; Jack Laufer as Frank; Marc Vann as Stan

Episode chronology
← Previous "Aunt Mommy"	Next → "Leap Day"
- Modern Family season 3

"Virgin Territory" is the 16th episode of the third season of the American sitcom Modern Family and the series' 64th episode overall. It aired on February 22, 2012. The episode was written by Elaine Ko and directed by Jason Winer.

In the episode, Claire, Jay and Mitchell go on and confess past sins during a family brunch with Mitchell destroying one of the proudest moments of Jay's, scoring a hole-in-one at a golf game. Jay is furious about it and leaves while Mitchell decides to follow him to apologize and the two of them make up. Claire leaves for some "yoga" classes and Gloria follows her because she wants to join her. When Claire finds excuses to not do the classes with her, Gloria realizes that something is wrong and that Claire is lying. She goes back only to discover that Claire does not take yoga classes but practices at a shooting range, something that relaxes her. Luke and Manny try to get revenge on Lily for taking all the attention away from them but their plan backfires and Cameron gets injured instead while also breaking Lily's doll. Phil goes to the mall with Alex, Haley and Lily to fix the doll and on their way there, Alex accidentally reveals that Haley and Dylan have had sex, something that shocks Phil.

"Virgin Territory" received positive reviews from the critics and it won the Writers Guild Award for Episodic Comedy, while Winer was nominated for an Emmy for Outstanding Directing in a Comedy Series.

== Plot ==
At family brunch, confessions of past sins prompt Mitchell (Jesse Tyler Ferguson) to ruin Jay's (Ed O'Neill) hole in one by confessing that he kicked the ball into the hole; Jay is upset and goes to the club to cool off.

Luke (Nolan Gould) and Manny (Rico Rodriguez) set a trap to get Lily (Aubrey Anderson-Emmons) in trouble by framing her for spilling milk. Instead, Cameron (Eric Stonestreet) takes the bait, slips on the milk, injures his back, and breaks Lily's doll. Phil (Ty Burrell) takes Alex (Ariel Winter), Haley (Sarah Hyland), and Lily to the store to repair it while Claire (Julie Bowen) leaves for yoga; Gloria (Sofía Vergara) asks to join her but is promptly dismissed. Cameron encourages Mitchell to reconcile with Jay at the club, but once he believes he's alone in the house, he reveals his back was never injured when he begins a frantic search for a tupperware he insists Claire never returned to him.

In the car, Alex accidentally reveals that Haley lost her virginity to her boyfriend, Dylan after mishearing the phrase “Haley’s aversion” as “Haley’s a virgin” and laughing. Phil is horrified by this and begins talking in euphemisms. At the mall, Haley feels guilty when Phil implies how disappointed he is; there is brief tension between the two before they reconcile and Phil tells Haley that he trusts her. Meanwhile, Alex - who never played with dolls growing up - finds she likes playing with one of Lily’s dolls after tidying it up for her, and Phil agrees to purchase it for her.

Arriving at her yoga studio, Claire is shocked to find that Gloria has followed her and insists on joining. Eventually, Claire confesses to Gloria that she doesn't go to yoga but instead goes to an indoor shooting range to relieve her stress. Gloria is supportive of Claire and surprises her by casually shooting a bullseye.

At the club, Mitchell mistakenly reveals that false hole in one to Jay's friends. Over lunch, Jay dismisses Mitchell's theory that the hole in one was significant because Mitchell had his first beer later that night as part of the celebration, saying it was special simply because it was a hole in one. However, he reveals that Mitchell's actual first beer was on his fourteenth birthday--something Mitchell had forgotten--and was significant.

Luke and Manny walk in on Cameron searching for the Tupperware, but he gives them his keys and offers to pay them to wash his car. Instead, Luke suggests taking the car down the street to impress Manny's crush. Awkwardly driving, Manny is successful until he hits a dead-end and, unable to do a U-turn, is forced to reverse down the street and back past his crush. Inside the house, Cam finds his Tupperware on a top shelf and climbs on drawers to retrieve it. In the driveway, Claire almost catches Luke and Manny in the car, but is distracted by a crashing sound coming from the kitchen. Rushing inside, she finds Cameron and parts of her counter on the floor; he's satisfied to have found his Tupperware.

Claire reveals to Phil that she'd known about Haley and Dylan for three months; he thanks her for not telling him.

== Reception ==
=== Ratings ===
In its original American broadcast "Virgin Territory" was watched by 11.54 million; up 0.32 million from the previous episode.

=== Reviews ===
While it is never to the degree of hysterical laughter, the show still hits the funny bone while being an honest story of a real-life modern times family. This episode, in particular, dealt with lies, virginity, and the tough reality of the secrets we all hold from our own family members. But this show deals with that subject in such a progressive and fun way.

— Tim Martens, Custodian Film Critic

"Virgin Territory" received positive reviews.

Leigh Raines of TV Fanatic rated the episode with 5/5. "I found this episode to be the perfect combination of funny and heartwarming. It never hurts to add realistic moments in every once in awhile [sic]. That's what Modern Family is good at and I'm glad they embraced it so well this week."

Meredith Blake from The A.V. Club gave a B rate to the episode saying that the episode was very funny but it suffered from a bit of narrative entropy.

Tim Martens of Custodian Film Critic rated the episode with 4/5 stating: "We really got to some deep subjects on this week’s “Modern Family.” [...] this week’s episode (titled “Virgin Territory”) touches on all the secrets that are kept deep within a family."

Shayelizatrotter from The Comedy Critic gave the episode an A− rate. "While this episode was, in my opinion, not as hilarious as the last, it was still full of great, comical moments!"

=== Accolades ===
This episode won the Writers Guild of America Award for Television: Episodic Comedy.

Jason Winer was nominated for a Primetime Emmy Award for this episode.
