= Lifetime Supply =

- Modern Family episode
- Phil (Ty Burrell) discovers that his lifetime supply of razor blades has run out.
- Episode no.: Season 3 Episode 11
- Directed by: Chris Koch
- Written by: Jeffrey Richman; Bill Wrubel
- Production code: 3ARG11
- Original air date: January 4, 2012

Guest appearances
- Benjamin Bratt as Javier; Philip Baker Hall as Walt; Don Lake as Dr. Sendroff; Steve Tom as Chip

Episode chronology
← Previous "Express Christmas"	Next → "Egg Drop"
- Modern Family season 3

"Lifetime Supply" is the 11th episode of the third season of the American sitcom Modern Family, and the series' 59th episode overall. It was aired on January 4, 2012. The episode was written by Jeffrey Richman & Bill Wrubel and directed by Chris Koch.

== Plot ==
Phil (Ty Burrell) goes to the doctor (Don Lake) for a check up. The doctor runs some tests telling him that he will call him if something is wrong. On Saturday he receives a call from the doctor but he misses it because he is in the shower. He calls back at his office but he can not reach the doctor since he is flying to London and he assumes the worst, starting to think that he is dying. Mitch (Jesse Tyler Ferguson) wins an environmental law award, an achievement that creates a competition between Cam (Eric Stonestreet) and himself. Cam, after Mitch's win, pulls out the award he won for fishing back in his hometown, and he displays it right next to Mitch's. Mitch thinks that Cam did that because he was jealous, but Cam says he was hiding it, along with all his other awards, so Mitch won't feel bad for not having any.

Alex (Ariel Winter) tells Mitch that she knows exactly how he feels because her mom does the same when she wins something by displaying Luke's (Nolan Gould) "awards" next to hers. The discussion with Alex makes Mitch realize that he is acting like a 14-year-old girl and he decides to make a display for Cam with all his awards. He goes to the garage and he is surprised of how many awards Cam won as a teenager but he was keeping them hidden to not hurt his feelings. The moment he tries to carry the box with the awards in the house, he sees a mouse and drops it, and starts kicking the box. Cam sees that and he believes that Mitch acts that way because he is jealous of his many awards.

Gloria (Sofía Vergara) tells Jay (Ed O'Neill) that she saw a black mouse in her dream the previous night and she is worried because in her country, a black mouse in a dream is a bad sign.

Manny's (Rico Rodriguez) dad Javier (Benjamin Bratt) comes to town to spend some time with his son. He tells Manny that he will take him to the horse races despite the fact that Jay tells Javier that he and Manny have plans to play golf. The three of them (Javier, Manny and Jay) end up all together at the races.

Gloria goes to the Dunphy house to help Haley (Sarah Hyland) with her Spanish. Phil tells her about the doctor, she combines her bad dream with that but she tries to not make Phil worried more. Another bad sign reinforces her concerns when Phil tells her that his lifetime supply of razor blades he won in a TV Game a few years ago, ran out that day.

Gloria talks about her omen fears to the whole family, who meet at the Dunphy's to support Phil and Claire (Julie Bowen). While all are gathered together, the doctor calls to tell Phil that everything is fine and that he was just calling him to ask him to be his real estate agent.

== Reception ==
=== Ratings ===
In its original American broadcast, "Lifetime Supply" was watched by 14.03 million; the third most watched episode of the season and series.

=== Reviews ===
"Lifetime Supply" received positive reviews.

Donna Bowman from The A.V. Club gave an A− to the episode saying that "...the show has had a rough third season in the eyes of critics, but the viewers keep showing up. [...] Give this excellent cast the right script and the right director, and they will kick it to the finish line strong every time." She stated that "Lifetime Supply" put together three strong plotlines and she closes her review: "This show’s not in any trouble. It needs more consistent writing, and it needs to learn from its body of work where its strengths and weaknesses lie. But there’s no reason we can’t see episodes like this one more weeks than not."

Maria Mercedes Lara from Wet Paint rated the episode with 4.5/5 and said that the episode was "a refreshing start to the second half of Season 3 for the series."

JeffEightyOne from Ape Donkey said that "Lifetime Supply" is "maybe the best episode of MF in a long time."

Will of Two Cents TV gave a good review to the episode saying that it was an excellent episode and that the return of Modern Family never fails to disappoint. "It is 30 minutes of pure entertainment! All of the actors and actresses all have this wonderful chemistry which makes the show award worthy."

Christine N. Ziemba of Paste Magazine gave the episode 7.5/10. "Modern Family is a good sitcom with a great cast—the laughs come fast and furious. The accolades are deserved, but at some point we wish that the storylines would entice us to come back as much as the one-liners and throwaway jokes."

Leigh Raines of TV Fanatic rated the episode with 3/5 saying that it was "a weak episode back overall".

=== Accolades ===
Ty Burrell submitted this episode for consideration due to his nomination for the Primetime Emmy Award for Outstanding Supporting Actor in a Comedy Series at the 64th Primetime Emmy Awards.
