= Leap Day (Modern Family) =

- Modern Family episode
- Episode no.: Season 3 Episode 17
- Directed by: Gail Mancuso
- Written by: Danny Zuker
- Production code: 3ARG19
- Original air date: February 29, 2012

Guest appearances
- Kali Rocha as party planner; John DiMaggio as boat captain

Episode chronology
← Previous "Virgin Territory"	Next → "Send Out the Clowns"
- Modern Family season 3

"Leap Day" is the 17th episode of the third season of the American sitcom Modern Family, and the series' 65th episode overall. It aired on February 29, 2012. The episode was written by Danny Zuker and directed by Gail Mancuso.

== Plot ==
It is February 29, Leap Day, and Cameron's (Eric Stonestreet) birthday; he's turning 40 but likes to think he's turning 10. Mitchell (Jesse Tyler Ferguson) is under pressure to arrange the perfect party and has planned a surprise Wizard of Oz-themed evening, setting everything up while Cameron is out for the day. When Cameron unexpectedly returns home, he unintentionally reminds Mitchell of a deadly tornado that destroyed his grandfather's farm and how upset he still is about it. Mitchell panics as he makes the connection between the film--which features a tornado--and Cameron's family, and abruptly cancels the party as he rushes to come up with a new idea in only a couple of hours.

Meanwhile, Phil (Ty Burrell) has Leap Day off to celebrate with his family at a trapeze arranged by Claire (Julie Bowen). To his horror, he discovers that Claire, Haley (Sarah Hyland), and Alex (Ariel Winter) are all on their menstrual cycles. Thinking their behavior will ruin his day, Phil conspires with Luke (Nolan Gould) and Manny (Rico Rodriguez) to go to the trapeze class without the girls but tells the boys not to mention the cycle. Phil has Luke pretend that he is similarly feeling under the weather like the girls, but this backfires as Claire--knowing what Phil is doing, and fed up with his lack of empathy and unwillingness to have an open conversation with her about menstruation--insists Luke stay home, which prompts Manny to go home. Phil then has Luke feign a cut on his finger using fake blood so they'll have an excuse to leave the house, but Luke accidentally spills most of the container on himself. When Claire finds the container of fake blood, Luke is forced to admit that Phil wanted to leave the girls' home due to their menstrual cycles (which he mispronounces). All three women are disgusted, and Claire berates Phil.

Jay (Ed O'Neill) and Gloria (Sofía Vergara) go to a bar to cheer on a soccer game. When one of the patrons gets competitive with Gloria, Jay takes her away to another table to avoid confrontation. Gloria wishes that Jay would have fought the patron, and his manliness comes into question, especially later at home when he puts on a now-pink robe that was mixed in with red laundry. However, when Javier disappoints Manny by once again cancelling a planned trip, Gloria decides she prefers Jay being reasonable.

Mitchell decides to throw a last-minute birthday cruise for Cameron with the whole family in attendance. However, the captain (John DiMaggio) says they will not all fit on the boat, mentioning that it was the largest available on only a two-hour notice. Cameron thinks Mitchell waited to the last minute to arrange the party while Gloria tries to reason with the captain. When the Captain gets confrontational with her, Jay gets confrontational with him despite Gloria telling him to calm down. When the captain remarks on Jay's age, an angry Gloria responds by slapping him in the face so hard that the Captain refuses to let any of them onto the boat and threatens to call the police while Cameron walks away upset. When Phil mentions Cameron's sadness to Claire, she berates him over his understanding of emotions. Phil responds that it has been an emotional day for him as well because he could not do what he wanted, prompting the girls to give him a hug.

When Mitchell tries to explain what happened to Cameron, Cameron berates him for being unable to throw a decent 10th birthday, to which Mitchell reminds him that he is actually 40. Cameron breaks down, and Mitchell sees that his sadness is over the fact that he is 40 and wanted to be 10 for his birthday. When Phil mentions to them all he wanted was to go to the amusement park, Mitchell decides to take Cameron there, where the two have a great time. The Dunphys also go, and the girls use their menstrual anger to pressure the trapeze attendant to allow Phil on. The girls then let their anger out playing Whac-A-Mole.

== Reception ==
=== Ratings ===
In its original American broadcast, "Leap Day" was watched by 11.68 million; up 0.14 million from the previous episode.

=== Reviews ===
"Leap Day" received positive reviews.

Leigh Raines from TV Fanatic gave the episode 4/5 saying that "The episode was like a ball of tension, under a weight of pressure, occurring during the time of the month for three feisty women. Or Satan's trifecta, according to Phil. Since the combined levels of screaming between Claire, Haley and Alex have left me with residual anxiety, I would say that Phil was pretty accurate."

Christine N. Ziemba of Paste Magazine gave the episode 9/10 saying that Leap Day should be turned into a national holiday, thanks to Phil Dunphy and Cam Tucker. "With “Leap Day,” this show made us do something that we haven't done many times throughout the season—laugh out loud—a lot. It's too bad that every day can't be Leap Day for Modern Family."

Cory Worrell of Ape Donkey gave a good review to the episode saying that "Leap Day" may be the best one of the season's episodes yet. "So many great moments in “Leap Day” including a candidate for line of the year courtesy of one Phil Dunphy, “Like when Wolfman, Dracula and Frankenstein showed up in the same movie....except this wasn't awesome!!” “Leap Day” was just pure, unadulterated hilarity."

Shayelizatrotter of The Comedy Critic gave an A− rate to the episode stating that "Modern Family” took advantage of the opportunity [of a holiday day] to produce a more than amusing episode. "Overall, “Leap Day” was an episode that made a rather bizarre holiday into something quite funny!"

Despite the general positive reviews, Phil Dyess-Nugent from The A.V. Club gave a C+ rate to the episode saying: "Tonight's episode wasn't the show at its best, and it demonstrated just how pointless this skillfully polished comedy projectile can feel when it really loses its direction in the course of an episode and spends the bulk of half an hour aimlessly wandering the parking lot. It also demonstrated just how second-hand it can feel when it fails to put its stamp on the ideas it's borrowed from feistier shows."

=== Accolades ===
Jesse Tyler Ferguson submitted this episode for consideration due to his nomination for the Primetime Emmy Award for Outstanding Supporting Actor in a Comedy Series at the 64th Primetime Emmy Awards.
