= Send Out the Clowns =

- Modern Family episode
- Episode no.: Season 3 Episode 18
- Directed by: Steven Levitan
- Written by: Steven Levitan; Jeffrey Richman; Bill Wrubel
- Production code: 3ARG16
- Original air date: March 14, 2012

Guest appearances
- Ellen Barkin as Mitzi Roth; Bobby Cannavale as Lewis

Episode chronology
← Previous "Leap Day"	Next → "Election Day"
- Modern Family season 3

"Send Out the Clowns" is the 18th episode of the third season of the American sitcom Modern Family, and the series' 66th episode overall. It aired on March 14, 2012. The episode was written by Steven Levitan, Jeffrey Richman & Bill Wrubel and directed by Steven Levitan.

== Plot ==
Cam (Eric Stonestreet) and Mitchell (Jesse Tyler Ferguson) run into Lewis (Bobby Cannavale)--with whom Cam used to perform a clown act--at a clown funeral. After a night out, the two resolve their issues surrounding Cam breaking up the duo in favor of a quiet life with Mitchell and agree to perform a birthday party together. Minutes before the performance begins, Cam reveals that this reunion is a one-time thing; Lewis is upset and goes off-script, comically ending the performance and destroying their set.

Phil (Ty Burrell) confidently prepares for a major real estate opportunity. At the listing, professional rival Mitzi Roth (Ellen Barkin) arrives unannounced, purposely falls into a bush, and tells the potential clients that Phil pushed her--Phil loses the opportunity. Back home, Luke (Nolan Gould) proposes that Phil use his spy pen to record Mitzi confessing her trick and play it back for the clients. Phil attempts this, and while Mitzi does confesses, she then steals the pen and reveals she knew all along. Later, Luke runs into Mitzi at the grocery store and guilts her into giving Phil the clients by casually mentioning how he overheard Phil worry about paying for college. Mitzi stops by the Dunphy house and gives Phil the clients; when she leaves, Phil and Luke celebrate their successful deception.

Meanwhile, Claire (Julie Bowen) casually confronts Alex (Ariel Winter) and Haley (Sarah Hyland) about not accepting her Facebook friend request. They lie and say they never received it, but the actually fear Claire judging what they post and posting embarrassing photos of them. When Claire refuses to give up, they're forced to create throwaway accounts and friend her there. While celebrating how they're now friends, the three discover that Claire has been tagged on a post with images of Claire drunk during Spring Break 1990; embarrassed, she slams the laptop shut.

Manny (Rico Rodriguez) invites classmate, Griffin (Dash Dobrofsky) over to hang out. Jay (Ed O'Neill) is suspicious that a popular kid like Griffin would hang out with Manny and surmises that Griffin is in awe of his motorcycle which he used to take Manny to school the other day. When Griffin arrives, Gloria (Sofía Vergara) notices how Griffin stares at her and proves to Jay that he has a crush on her. Later, Manny overhears Gloria expressing to Jay her willingness to let this supposed friendship go on as she hopes it will lead to a genuine friendship between the boys. Manny reveals that he's using the friendship to get closer to Griffin's sister, but the revelation about Griffin's true motives makes him feel less guilty.

== Reception ==
=== Ratings ===
In its original American broadcast, "Send Out the Clowns" was watched by 10.60 million; slightly down by 0.03 million from previous episode.

=== Reviews ===
"Send Out the Clowns" received positive reviews.

Laigh Raines of TV Fanatic rated the episode with 4/5. "The ending was probably my favorite part. When the girls found a picture of Claire funneling on Spring Break in 1990 and Claire started screaming "What is tagging!?!" I was in stitches laughing. This is why parents don't need Facebook!!"

Christine N. Ziemba from Paste Magazine rated the episode with 8/10 saying: "Yes, we laughed, we cried—but not nearly as much as the “Leap Day” episode." She closed her review with: "At times, the episode felt like the episode’s clown car scene—when Cam and his friends all squeeze into a Mini to head to drink after the funeral—because Levitan and company tried to cram too many things into 22 minutes. Just when things were ramping up, it was time to cue the credits."

Michael Adams of 411mania rated the episode with 8/10 naming character of the week Bobby Cannavale's character, Lewis the Clown. "Bobby made Lewis a very lewd and dirty clown, all the while being hysterical. I didn't see this coming from a guy who's known for his more serious and bad-ass roles."

Donna Bowman of The A.V. Club gave a B− rating to the episode, saying that she doesn't find clowns funny. "Clown humor. It's a tricky thing. I know it's a grand tradition of folklore and nomadic entertainment and pantomime heritage, but I don't think I'm alone in regarding clowns less as funny than as vaguely impressive in their commitment to an arcane aesthetic."

The review from The FilteredLens was also positive and rated the episode with 9/10 stating that the episode "continued to reignite the flame of this show and make season three memorable. It was definitely a classic and one of the better episodes of the season."
