= Olive Crest =

American non-profit organization

Olive Crest is a non-profit organization dedicated to preventing child abuse by strengthening, equipping, and restoring children and families in crisis. Olive Crest was founded in 1973, and serves 5,000 children and families each year throughout California, Nevada, and the Pacific Northwest. Within these states are the seven regions Olive Crest is currently located in: the Inland Empire and Desert Communities, Los Angeles, Nevada, Orange County, the Pacific Northwest, San Diego, and Santa Barbara.

== History ==
In 1973, Dr. Don (psychology major) and Lois Verleur took in four teenage girls and opened their first home for children in Orange County, California. Drawing from the olive tree in the front yard and the idea of a family crest, Olive Crest, a name symbolizing “peaceful family,” was born.

== Outcomes and results ==
Over the last five decades, Olive Crest has transformed the lives of more than 175,000 children and families by preventing child abuse, equipping and educating children in crisis, and preserving the family. Key stats:

- 440,816 "safe days" for children in 2020
- Over 4,000 children and families served every day
- Over 3,400 adoptions since 2008
- 88% successful program completion
- Over 4,000,000 volunteer hours caring for children in 2020
- 99% stability rate for kids
- 99.8% safety for children in Olive Crest's care
