= Michele O'Callaghan =

Michele O'Callaghan (September 14, 1963 – December 16, 2011) was a noted American makeup artist. She was personal makeup artist to David Letterman on The Late Show for 23 years and made occasional appearances on his show. O'Callaghan also did makeup for Bob Costas and Bryant Gumbel, as well as dozens of sports shows on every TV network.

== Personal life ==
She was married to Thomas Togneri and had three children. She died of cancer on December 16, 2011, aged 48.

Keith Olbermann and David Letterman devoted large segments of their shows to her on December 19, 2011, three days following her death from cancer.
