= Egg Drop =

- Modern Family episode
- Episode no.: Season 3 Episode 12
- Directed by: Jason Winer
- Written by: Paul Corrigan; Brad Walsh
- Production code: 3ARG12
- Original air date: January 11, 2012

Guest appearance
- Zoe Jarman as Lindsay

Episode chronology
← Previous "Lifetime Supply"	Next → "Little Bo Bleep"
- Modern Family season 3

"Egg Drop" is the 12th episode of the third season of the American sitcom Modern Family, and the series' 60th episode overall. It was aired on January 11, 2012. The episode was written by Paul Corrigan & Brad Walsh and directed by Jason Winer.

== Plot ==
Luke (Nolan Gould) and Manny (Rico Rodriguez) have a school project where they have to find a way of how to drop an egg from a certain height and it will not break. They both struggle with it and when Manny tells Jay (Ed O'Neill) that Luke is going to nail the project because he is sure Claire (Julie Bowen) will help him. Jay calls Claire to make sure that she will not help Luke because it will be unfair. Claire, who was not planning to help, becomes convinced that Jay is helping Manny, and resolves to help Luke with his project.

Phil (Ty Burrell) has a seminar about real estate and he needs Haley (Sarah Hyland) and Claire's help. Claire steps out asking him to find someone else to help because she has to help Luke with his project. Phil calls Gloria (Sofía Vergara) who immediately accepts. They all go to the place where the presentation is going to happen and rehearse Phil's speech and what everyone has to do. Haley is given the job of announcing Phil and placing a prize card under a chair while Gloria is expected to ask a loaded question as part of Phil's sales pitch. After the rehearsal, Gloria and Haley ask Phil to let them go for mani-pedis since they have time before the actual presentation.

As they come out of the salon, Gloria and Haley find their car has been towed. Back at the seminar, things go disastrously for Phil; he awkwardly announces himself to the stage, Haley had forgotten to put the red card under a seat and without Gloria to set him up Phil stumbles through his prepared speech. When they get back, Phil is angry with Haley and Gloria. When he seems to back off when Gloria takes the full blame, Gloria gets mad herself at Phil always thinking more highly of her than she deserves, telling him this is not how families act. Phil tells Gloria how much she disappointed and embarrassed him, allowing the two to work through their issues.

Meanwhile, Cam (Eric Stonestreet) and Mitch (Jesse Tyler Ferguson) welcome at their home a potential birth mother named Lindsay (Zoe Jarman). Lindsay seems impressed with the two of them, especially when she discovers that Cam is a musician. She asks them to sing something for her and the baby and when they do Lindsay makes a comment about Mitch being a better singer than Cam, as well as agreeing to let Mitch and Cam become the fathers of her baby. Offended by the singing comment, Cam later tries to prove that he is a good singer by singing "If You Leave Me Now". After the song ends, however, Lindsay changes her mind about the baby, deciding to keep it.

Manny and Luke, with the help of Jay and Claire respectively, have their projects finished. The competitive spirits of Jay and Claire, though, lead them at the school to test the projects. Both projects are successful but Claire and Jay want to drop them from higher, frustrated that neither of them "won".

Manny and Luke worry that leaving them alone will make them realize how they manipulated them to make the projects for them. Claire, seeing the boys nervous, believes that they are nervous because they wanted to do the projects on their own and they took the joy from them. Jay agrees with her and they try to apologize to the kids. Before they get the chance to say anything, Manny tells them about how they manipulated them and instead of apologizing, they tell them that they will do the project from the beginning totally on their own this time. Jay and Claire are then both outperformed by Alex (Ariel Winter), who demonstrates her winning project that she had created in the past, and supposedly gained the interest of NASA.

== Reception ==
=== Ratings ===
In its original American broadcast, "Egg Drop" was watched by 12.12 million; down two million from the previous episode.

=== Reviews ===
"Egg Drop" received positive reviews.

Meredith Blake from The A.V. Club gave the episode a B+ rate saying that the episode was mostly very funny with a few brief, problematic moments. "“Egg Drop” is in many ways a showcase example of what Modern Family does best; that is, taking a stale sitcom plot and making it seem fresh again with clever writing and some well-observed family dynamics."

Leigh Raines of TV Fanatic rated the episode with 4/5 saying that it was "a major improvement over last week's installment" and "just another example of how important competition is to the Pritchett crew."

Christine N. Ziemba from Paste Magazine gave a 9/10 to the episode stating that the third season of the show was uneven thus far. "...the show finally cast off the doldrums with this week’s "Egg Drop,” a fast-paced, zany episode that had the Pritchett and Dunphy clans involved in various hi-jinks—and not just for cheap laughs."

JeffEightOne from Ape Donkey didn't find the episode as strong as the previous one but it was a solid episode. "“Egg Drop” is exactly what I mentioned before in that it was a collection of singles, but no home runs to be found. This keeps it from being transcendent, but it’s nonetheless a solid B-level outing for Modern Family."

== Notes ==
- On March 14, 2012, the whole cast along with creator Steven Levitan, were on the Paley Festival where Eric Stonestreet and Julie Bowen revealed that Claire's fall on the episode was not scripted. Bowen slipped on the egg shells and fell.
