= Aubrey Anderson-Emmons =

American actress (born 2007)

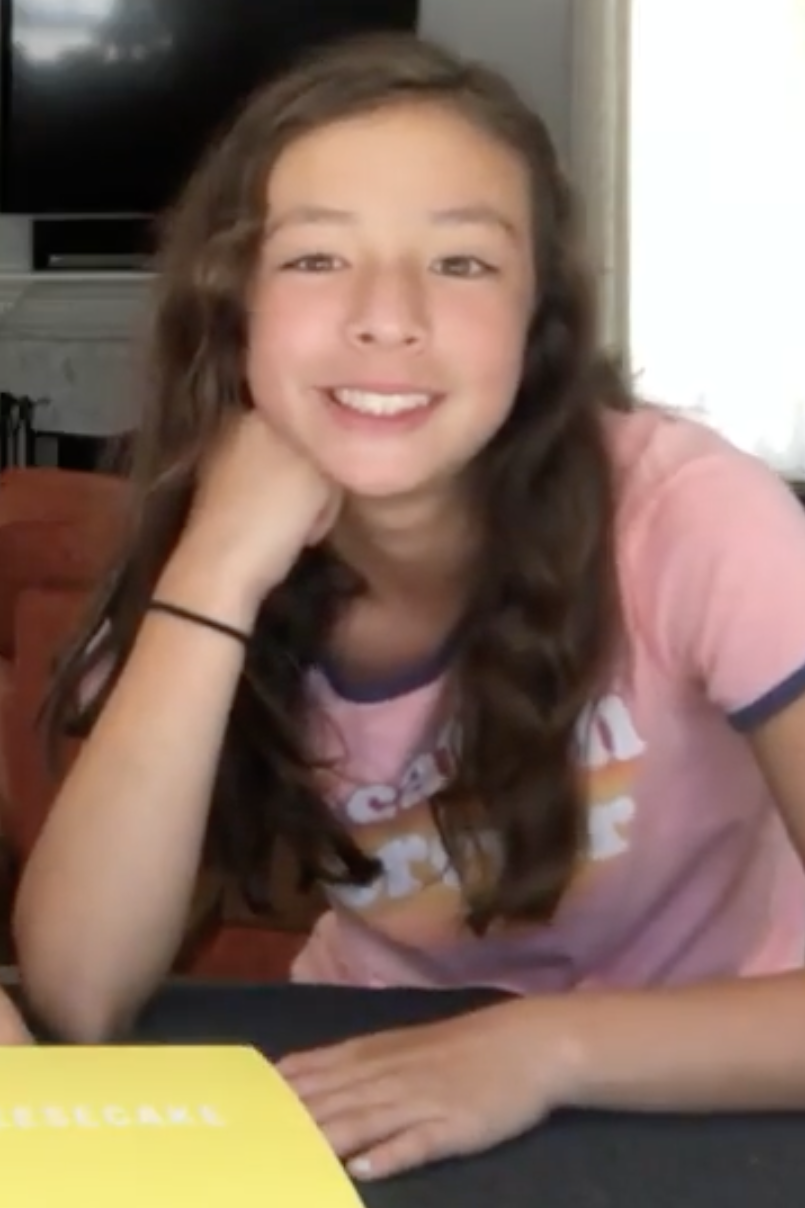
- Anderson-Emmons in 2018
- Born: June 2007 (age 19); Santa Monica, California, U.S.
- Other name: Frances Anderson
- Occupations: Actress; singer; musician
- Years active: 2010–present
- Television: Modern Family
- Mother: Amy Anderson

Aubrey Frances Anderson-Emmons, also known as Frances Anderson (born June 2007) is an American actress and musician. She is known for her role as Lily Tucker-Pritchett on ABC's Modern Family (2011–2020).

== Early life ==
Anderson-Emmons is the daughter of comedian and actress Amy Anderson and Kent Emmons, a media entrepreneur. She has Korean and European heritage.

== Career ==
Anderson-Emmons joined the cast of Modern Family in its third season in 2011, when she replaced Ella and Jaden Hiller in the role of Lily Tucker-Pritchett, a Vietnamese-born child adopted by a gay American couple. Her role has been praised for raising cultural diversity awareness. In 2012, at age 4, she became the youngest person ever to receive the Screen Actors Guild Award, which she won as part of the show's ensemble cast. She was the youngest Asian American child star on the red carpet at the 2012 and 2013 Primetime Emmy Awards.

Anderson-Emmons has a YouTube channel, FoodMania Review, with her mother, Amy, which she began in 2015. As of October 2026, she has over 44,200 subscribers and over 6.8 million combined views.

Anderson released her debut single "Telephones & Traffic" on May 23, 2025, under the name Frances Anderson.

In July 2025, she joined the Off-Broadway industry reading of Haters Gonna Hate, play adaptation of The Misanthrope by Justin Borak. In December 2025, Anderson-Emmons starred as Dorothy on The Wonderful Winter of Oz at Scherr Forum Theatre directed by Becky Lythgoe.

That August, Anderson explained in an interview with E! News her reasons for her name change to Frances Anderson, stating, "Frances is actually part of my legal name—it's my middle name, and it's after my mom’s old family friend. I thought, one, it was a bit shorter than 'Aubrey Anderson-Emmons.' I do have a long, hyphenated last name. I wanted to switch it up and I wanted people to see a new side of me. And I wanted to create a space specifically just for music." The interview coincided with the release of her debut EP Drown, on August 8, 2025.

== Philanthropy ==
Anderson-Emmons does charity work for St. Jude Children's Hospital, California Covenant House Youth Shelter, Let Them Play Sports Organization, Juvenile Diabetes Research Foundation, Olive Crest, Help A Mother Out, My Stuff Bags, EIF Revlon Run/Walk For Women and Dave Thomas Foundation For Adoption.

== Personal life ==
In June 2025, Anderson-Emmons came out as bisexual.

== Filmography ==
=== Film ===
Year	Title	Role	Notes
2014	Distance	Emma Stelzer	Short film
2019	Eva	Lara	Short film
2024	Tailwinds	Girl	Short film

=== Television ===
Year	Title	Role	Notes
2011–2020	Modern Family	Lily Tucker-Pritchett	Main role; 163 episodes
2017	Bill Nye Saves the World	Herself	Episode: "This Diet is Bananas"
2018	Paradise Run	Herself	Episode: "A Modern Wimpy Fuller Run"

== Theatre ==
Year	Title	Role	Theatre	Notes
2025	The Wonderful Winter of Oz!	Dorothy	Scherr Forum Theatre	Leading role

== Awards and nominations ==
Award	Year	Category	Work	Result	Ref.
Screen Actors Guild Awards	2012	Outstanding Performance by an Ensemble in a Comedy Series	Modern Family	Won	
Screen Actors Guild Awards	2013	Outstanding Performance by an Ensemble in a Comedy Series	Modern Family	Won	
Screen Actors Guild Awards	2014	Outstanding Performance by an Ensemble in a Comedy Series	Modern Family	Won	
Screen Actors Guild Awards	2015	Outstanding Performance by an Ensemble in a Comedy Series	Modern Family	Nominated	
Screen Actors Guild Awards	2016	Outstanding Performance by an Ensemble in a Comedy Series	Modern Family	Nominated	
Screen Actors Guild Awards	2017	Outstanding Performance by an Ensemble in a Comedy Series	Modern Family	Nominated	
