= Anti-Polish sentiment =

Hostility, prejudice, or discrimination against Poland or people of Polish ethnicity

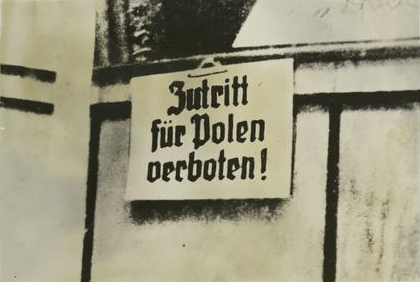
German notice in German-occupied Poland, 1939: "No entry for Poles!" written with fraktur (German: Zutritt für Polen verboten!)

Anti-Polish sentiment, Polonophobia, or anti-Polonism (Polish: antypolonizm), are terms for negative attitudes, prejudices, and actions against Polish people as an ethnic group, Poland as their country, and their culture. These include ethnic prejudice against Poles and persons of Polish descent, other forms of discrimination, and mistreatment of Poles and the Polish diaspora.

This prejudice led to mass killings and genocide or it was used to justify atrocities both before and during World War II, most notably by the German Nazis and Ukrainian Insurgent Army. While Soviet repressions and massacres of Polish citizens were ideologically motivated, the negative attitude of Soviet authorities to the Polish nation is well-attested.

Nazi Germany killed between 1.8 and 2.7 million ethnic Poles; 140,000 Poles were deported to Auschwitz, where at least half of them perished.

Anti-Polish sentiment includes stereotyping Poles as unintelligent and aggressive, as thugs, thieves, alcoholics, and antisemites.

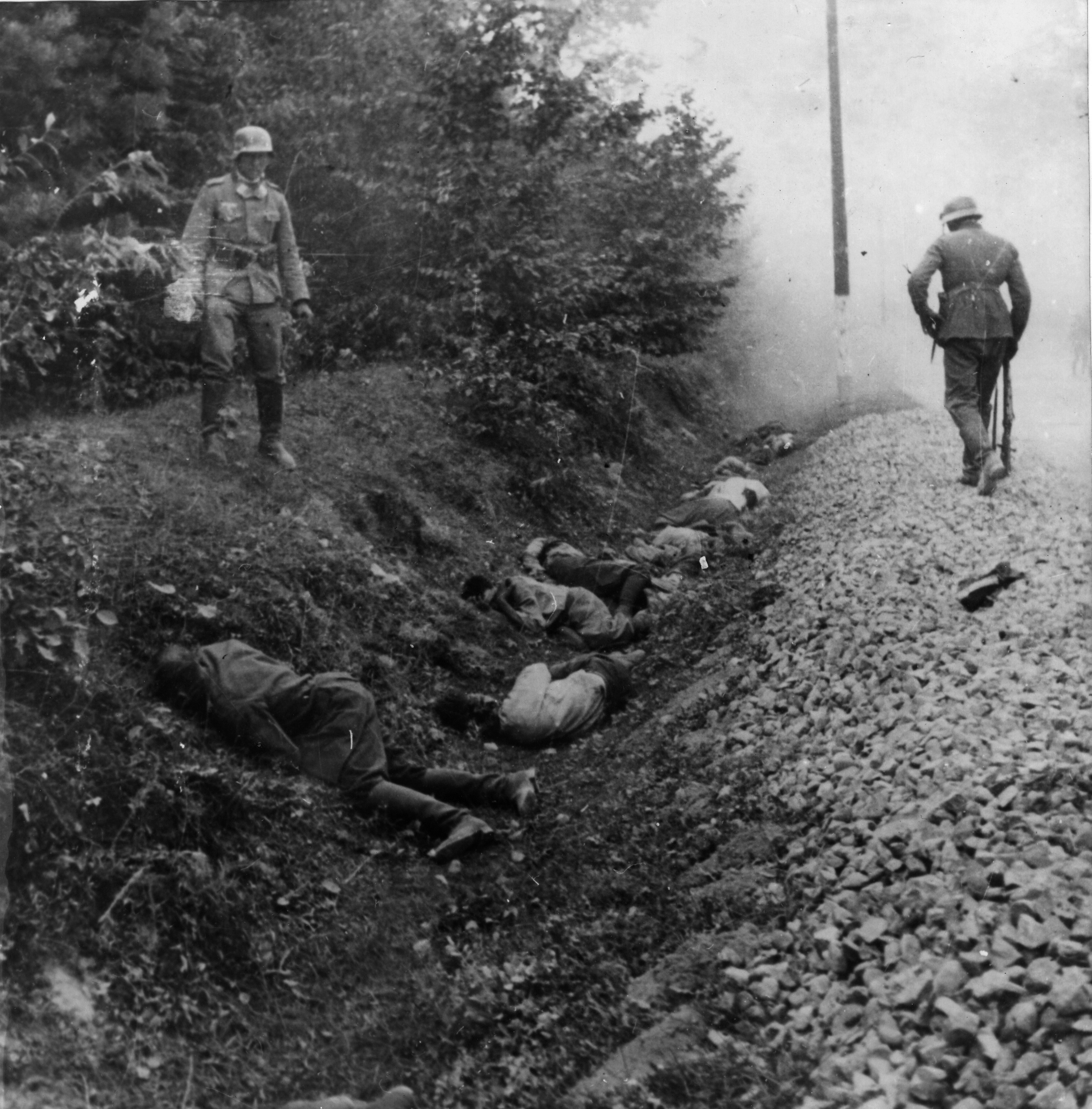
About 300 Polish prisoners of war were murdered by the soldiers of the German 15th motorised infantry regiment in the Ciepielów massacre on 9 September 1939. Hitler ordered the "destruction of the enemy" beyond military objectives: Nazi Germany classified Poles as "subhuman" and war crimes were committed against them from the outset of the invasion of Poland.

== Etymology ==
According to Adam Leszczynski, the term antypolonizm was coined by journalist Edmund Osmańczyk in 1946. Osmańczyk condemned anti-Jewish violence in postwar Poland, and concluded:

The growing anti-Polonism in the world has the same source as antisemitism: aversion to weak people, chronically handicapped by the fate of the handicapped, weak people by the difference between the hope of individuals and the poverty of the masses, people living scattered, constantly fighting for their homeland. ... We are becoming unpopular as a nation and, as with the Jewish people, only individuals are granted the right to be sympathetic.

== Features ==
Forms of hostility toward Poles and Polish culture include:

- Organized persecution of the Poles as a nation or as an ethnic group;
- A xenophobic dislikes of Poles, including Polish immigrants;
- Cultural anti-Polish sentiment: a prejudice against Poles and Polish-speaking persons or their customs, language and education;
- Stereotypes about Poland and Polish people in the media and other forms of popular culture.

A historic example of anti-Polish sentiment was polakożerstwo (in English, "the devouring of Poles") – a Polish term coined in the 19th century in relation to the dismemberment and annexation of Poland by Prussia, the Habsburg monarchy and Russia. Polakożerstwo described the forcible suppression of Polish culture, education and religion in historically Polish territories, and the gradual elimination of Poles from everyday life as well as from owning property. Anti-Polish policies were implemented by the German Empire under Otto von Bismarck, especially during the Kulturkampf, and enforced up to the end of the First World War. Organized persecution of Poles raged in the territories annexed by Russia, mainly under Tsar Nicholas II. Historic actions inspired by anti-Polonism ranged from felonious acts motivated by hatred, to physical extermination of the Polish nation, the goal of which was to eradicate the Polish state. During World War II, when most of Polish society became the object of genocidal policies of Nazi Germany, anti-Polonism led to an unprecedented campaign of mass murder in German-occupied Poland. In the modern day, among those who often express their hostile attitude towards the Polish people are some Russian politicians and their far-right political parties who search for a new identity rooted in the defunct Russian Empire after the collapse of the Soviet Union.

=== Anti-Polish stereotypes ===
In the Russian language, the term mazurik (мазурик), a synonym for "pickpocket", "petty thief", literally means "little Masovian". The word is an example how Vladimir Putin's liberal use of colloquialisms has been gaining media attention from abroad.

The "Polish plumber" cliché may symbolize the threat of cheap labor from poorer European countries to "steal" low-paying jobs in wealthier parts of Europe. On the other hand, others associate it with affordability and dependability of European migrant workers.

== Before the Second Polish Republic, 1918 ==
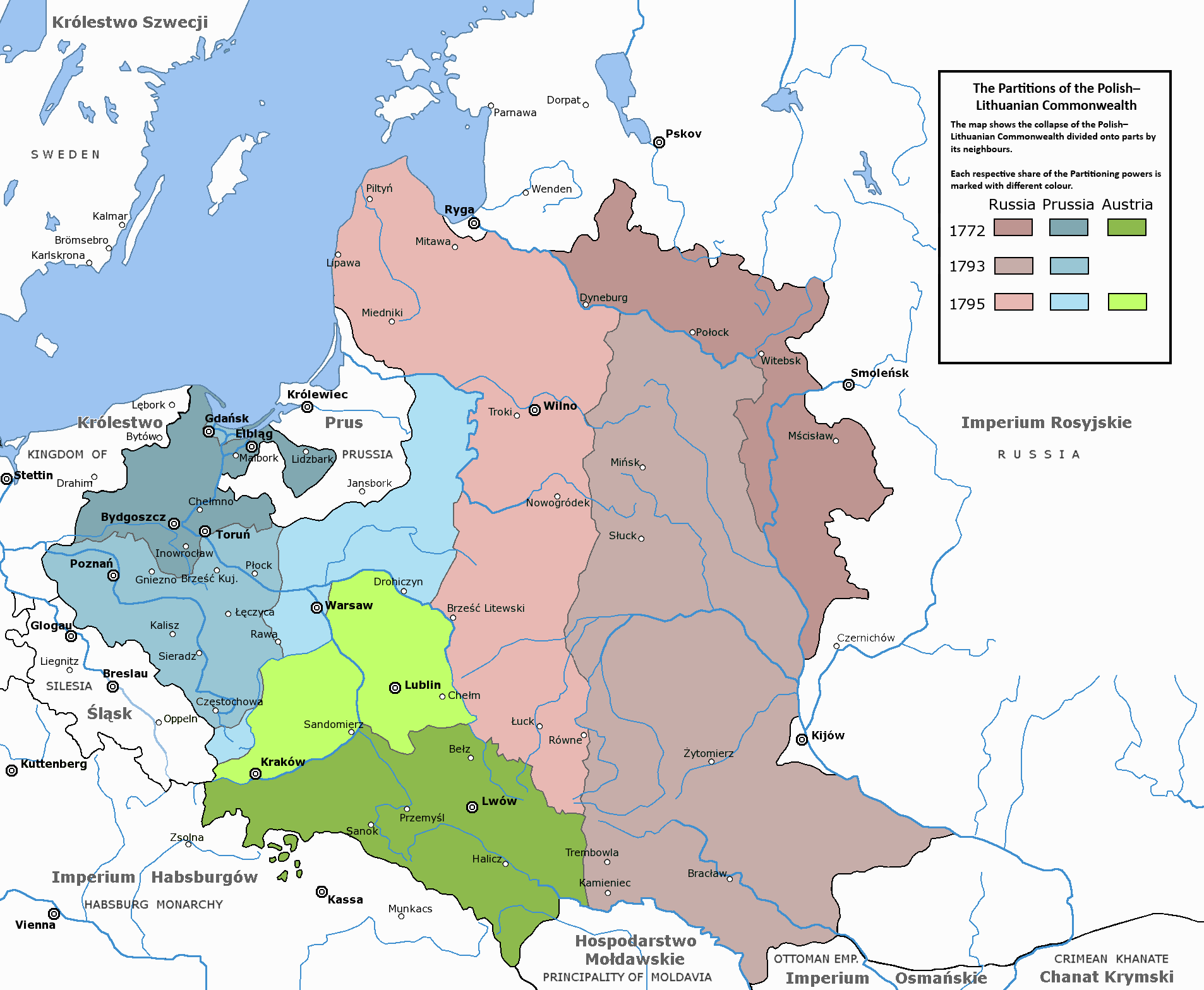
Partitions of Poland, 1795

Anti-Polish rhetoric combined with the condemnation of Polish culture was most prominent in the 18th-century Prussia during the partitions of Poland. However, anti-Polish propaganda begins with the Teutonic Order in the 14th century. It was a very important tool in the Order's attempt to conquer the Duchy of Lithuania which eventually failed because of Lithuania's Personal union with the Crown of the Kingdom of Poland and the Christianization of Lithuania to Catholicism. The first major thinker to openly call for the genocide of the Polish people was the 14th century German Dominican theologian Johannes von Falkenberg who on behalf of the Teutonic Order argued not only that Polish pagans should be killed, but that all Poles should be subject to genocide on the grounds that Poles were an inherently heretical race and that even the King of Poland, Jogaila, a Christian convert, ought to be murdered. The assertion that Poles were heretical was largely politically motivated as the Teutonic Order desired to conquer Polish lands despite Christianity having become the dominant religion in Poland centuries prior.

Germany, becoming more and more permeated with Teutonic Prussianism, continued to pursue these tactics. For instance, David Blackbourn of Harvard University speaks of the scandalised writings of German intellectual Johann Georg Forster, who was granted a tenure at Vilnius University by the Polish Commission of National Education in 1784. Forster wrote of Poland's "backwardness" in a similar vein to "ignorance and barbarism" of southeast Asia. Such views were later repeated in the German ideas of Lebensraum and exploited by the Nazis. German academics between the 18th and 20th centuries attempted to project, in the difference between Germany and Poland, a "boundary between civilization and barbarism; high German Kultur and primitive Slavdom" (1793 racist diatribe by J.C. Schulz republished by the Nazis in 1941). Prussian officials, eager to secure Polish partition, encouraged the view that the Poles were culturally inferior and in need of Prussian tutelage. Such racist texts, originally published from the 18th century onwards, were republished by the German Reich prior to and after its invasion of Poland.

Frederick the Great of Prussia nourished a particular hatred and contempt for the Polish people. Following his conquest of Poland, he compared the Poles to "Iroquois" of Canada. In his all-encompassing anti-Polish campaign, even the nobility of Polish background living in Prussia were obliged to pay higher taxes than those of German heritage. Polish monasteries were viewed as "lairs of idleness" and their property often seized by Prussian authorities. The prevalent Catholicism among Poles was stigmatised. The Polish language was persecuted at all levels.

After the Polish–Russian War in early 1600s, Poland was greatly blamed by the Russians as the cause of chaos and tyranny in Russia. The future House of Romanov, who would found the Russian Empire after taken power from the Rurik dynasty, used a number of distortion activities, describing Poles as backward, cruel and heartless, praising the rebellion against Poles; and heavily centered around the Orthodox belief. When Tsardom of Russia invaded Poland at the Russo-Polish war of 1650s, the Russians caused a number of atrocities, and destroyed most of Eastern Poland, sometimes joining destruction with its Ukrainian ally led by Bohdan Khmelnytsky and the Swedes in the parallel Swedish invasion. The war was held as a Russian triumph for its attempt to destroy Poland.

Sweden, which developed anti-Polish sentiment due to previous Polish–Swedish wars in hope to gain territorial and political influence, as well as dispute with the Polish Crown because of Sigismund III Vasa, launched an invasion known as the Deluge. Swedish invaders, joined force with Russian invaders in the east, together destroyed Poland and took away many of the Polish national treasures, as well as committing atrocities against Poles. The Poles were treated very brutally by Swedes, and as a result, Poland lost its wealth and was reduced in its development. Similar to Russia, Sweden hailed the destruction of Poland as a national triumph.

In the 18th century, Russia as an empire attempted to make Poland disintegrate by using liberum veto, creating chaos and prevented reforms, as by Russian accords, was against the ideal of Imperial Russia's future plan to partition Poland. Russia often sent troops and carried out atrocities on Polish civilians. When Poland adopted its first ever Constitution of 3 May 1791, the first Constitution in Europe, Russia sent troops and brutally suppressed Polish people.

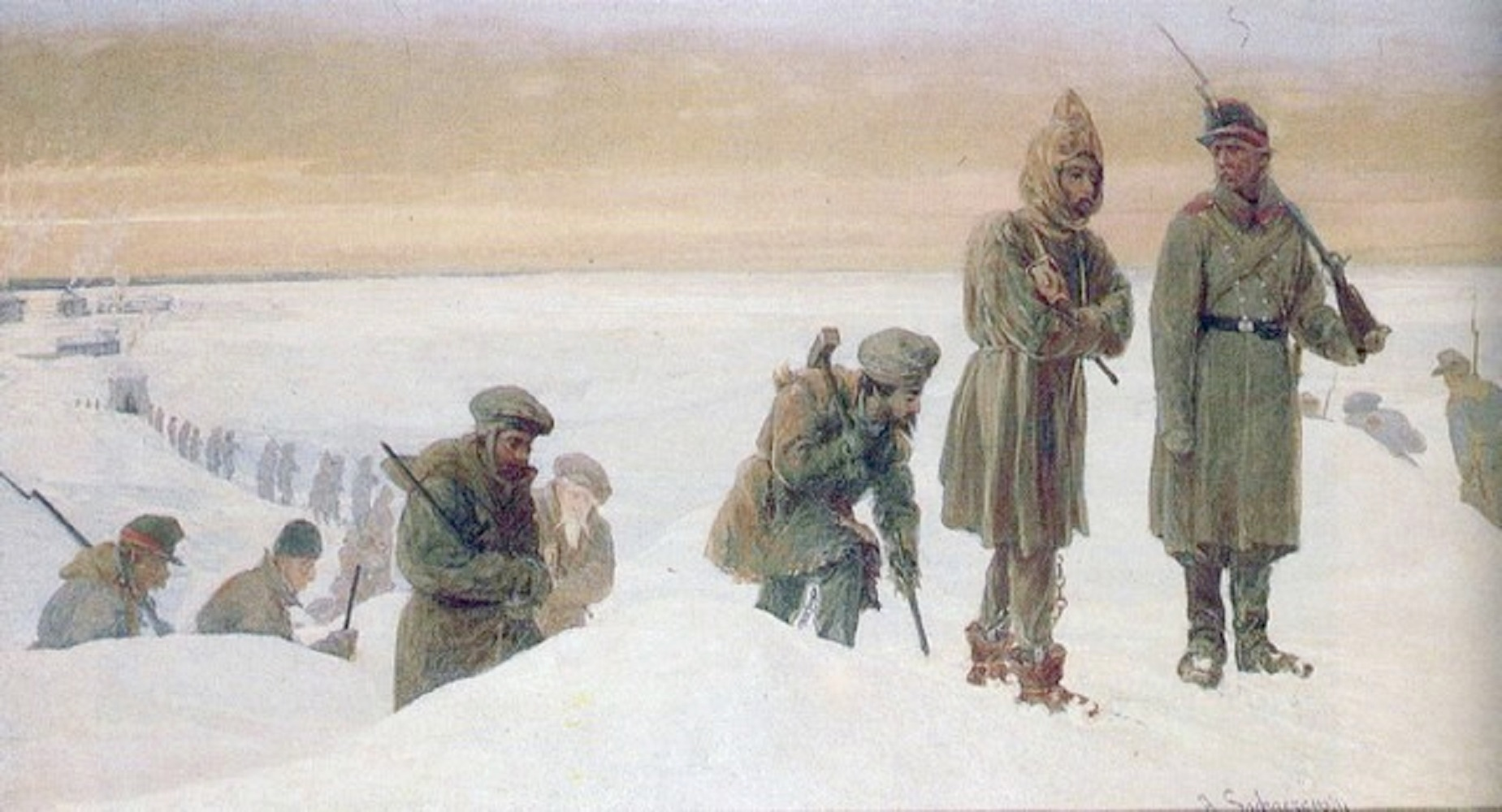
19th-century Polish exiles in Siberia (painting)

When Poland lost the last vestiges of its independence in 1795 and remained partitioned for 123 years, ethnic Poles were subjected to discrimination in two areas: the Germanisation under Prussian and later German rule, and Russification in the territories annexed by Imperial Russia.

Being a Pole under the Russian occupation was in itself almost culpable – wrote Russian historian Liudmila Gatagova. – "Practically all of the Russian government, bureaucracy, and society were united in one outburst against the Poles." – "Rumor mongers informed the population about an order that had supposedly been given to kill [...] and take away their land." Polish culture and religion were seen as threats to Russian imperial ambitions. Tsarist Namestniks suppressed them on Polish lands by force. The Russian anti-Polish campaign, which included confiscation of Polish nobles' property, was waged in the areas of education, religion as well as language. Polish schools and universities were closed in a stepped-up campaign of russification. In addition to executions and mass deportations of Poles to Katorga camps, Tsar Nicholas I established an occupation army at Poland's expense.

The fact that Poles, unlike the Orthodox Russians, were overwhelmingly Roman Catholic gave impetus to their religious persecution. At the same time, with the emergence of Panslavist ideology, Russian writers accused the Polish nation of betraying their "Slavic family" because of their armed efforts aimed at winning independence. Hostility toward Poles was present in many of Russia's literary works and media of the time.

"During and after the 1830-1831 insurrection many Russian writers voluntarily participated in anti-Polish propaganda. Gogol wrote Taras Bulba, an anti-Polish novel of high literary merit, to say nothing about lesser writers." — Prof. Vilho Harle

Pushkin, together with three other poets, published a pamphlet called "On the Taking of Warsaw" to celebrate the crushing of the revolt. His contribution to the frenzy of anti-Polish writing comprised poems in which he hailed the capitulation of Warsaw as a new "triumph" of imperial Russia.

In Prussia and later in Germany, Poles were forbidden to build homes, and their properties were targeted for forced buy-outs financed by the Prussian and subsequent German governments. Bismarck described Poles, as animals (wolves), that "one shoots if one can" and implemented several harsh laws aimed at their expulsion from traditionally Polish lands. The Polish language was banned from public use, and ethnically Polish children punished at school for speaking Polish. Poles were subjected to a wave of forceful evictions (Rugi Pruskie). The German government financed and encouraged settlement of ethnic Germans into those areas aiming at their geopolitical germanisation. The Prussian Landtag passed laws against Catholics.

Toward the end of World War I during Poland's fight for independence, Imperial Germany made further attempts to take control over the territories of Congress Poland, aiming at ethnic cleansing of up to 3 million Jewish and Polish people which was meant to be followed by a new wave of settlement by ethnic Germans. In August 1914, the German imperial army destroyed the city of Kalisz, chasing out tens of thousands of its Polish citizens.

== Interwar period (1918–1939) ==
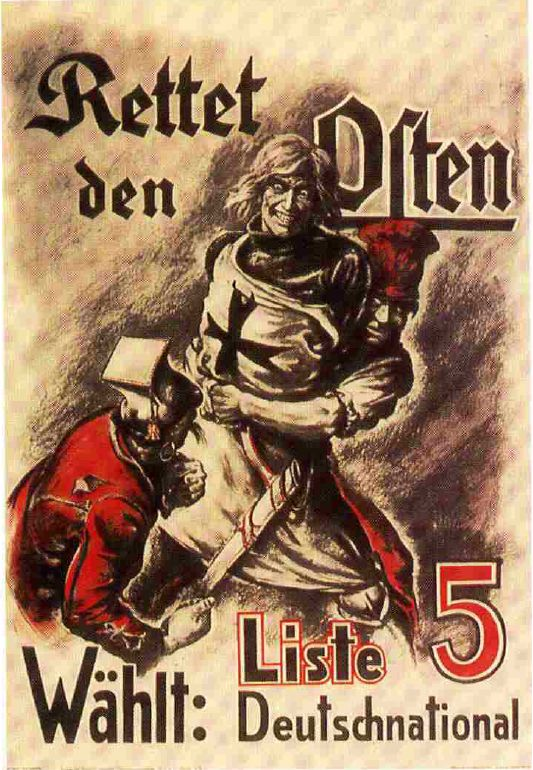
A German National People's Party poster from 1920 showing a Teutonic knight being attacked by Poles and socialists as the caption reads "Save the East"

After Poland regained its independence as the Second Republic at the end of World War I, the question of new Polish borders could not have been easily settled against the will of her former long-term occupiers. Poles continued to be persecuted in the disputed territories, especially in Silesia. The German campaign of discrimination contributed to the Silesian Uprisings, where Polish workers were openly threatened with losing their jobs and pensions if they voted for Poland in the Upper Silesia plebiscite.

At the Versailles Peace Conference of 1919, British historian and politician Lewis Bernstein Namier, who served as part of the British delegation, was seen as one of the biggest enemies of the newly independent Polish state in the British political sphere and in the newly-independent Poland. Namier modified the previously-proposed Curzon line by detaching the city of Lwów from Poland with a version called Curzon Line "A". It was sent to Soviet diplomatic representatives for acceptance. The earlier compromised version of Curzon line which was debated at the Spa Conference of 1920 was renamed Curzon Line "B".

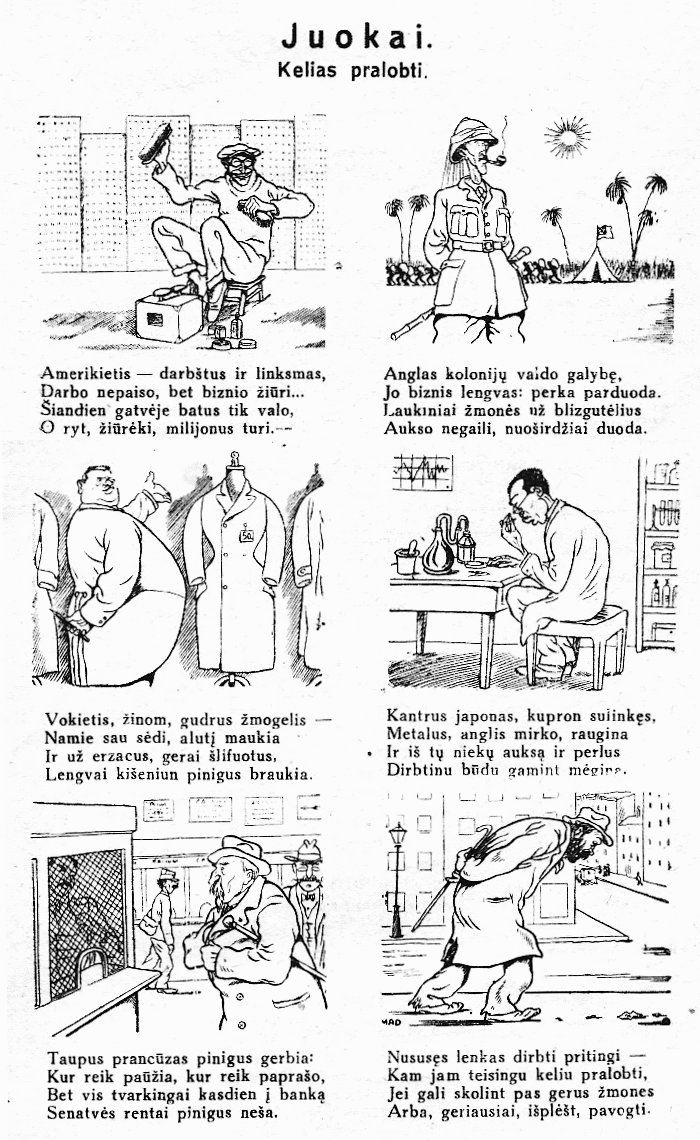
Anti-Polish cartoons were published in Lithuania during interbellum, which depicting the Poles in the bottom east as a lazy, poor and denegerate people

In the politics of inter-war Germany, anti-Polish feelings ran high. The American historian Gerhard Weinberg observed that for many Germans in the Weimar Republic, "Poland was an abomination", Poles were "an East European species of cockroach", Poland was usually described as a Saisonstaat (a state for a season), and Germans used the phrase "Polish economy" (polnische Wirtschaft) for a situation of hopeless muddle. Weinberg noted that in the 1920s–1930s, leading German politicians refused to accept Poland as a legitimate nation, and hoped instead to partition Poland, probably with the help of the Soviet Union. The British historian A. J. P. Taylor wrote in 1945 that National Socialism was inevitable because the Germans wanted "to repudiate the equality with the peoples of (central and) eastern Europe which had then been forced upon them" after 1918.

During Stalin's Great Terror in the Soviet Union, a major ethnic cleansing operation, known as the Polish Operation, took place from about 25 August 1937 through 15 November 1938. According to Soviet NKVD archives, 111,091 Poles, and people accused of ties with Poland, were executed, and 28,744 were sentenced to Gulag labor camps, for a total of 139,835 Polish victims. This number constitutes 10 per cent of the officially persecuted persons during the entire Yezhovshchina period, with confirming NKVD documents. The prosecuted Polish families were accused of anti-Soviet activities.

Outside the Germans and Russians, the Lithuanians also developed a very strong anti-Polish hatred, partly due to historical grievances. For the Lithuanians, the Polish–Lithuanian War of 1920, which costed the capital Vilnius to be on Polish hand, cemented anti-Polish sentiment. Virtually throughout the inter-war, anti-Polish had been omnipresent in Lithuania, and Polish minority in Lithuania faced a very harsh repression by the Lithuanian authorities. The 1938 Polish ultimatum to Lithuania led to the establishment of relations, but it remained extremely difficult as Lithuania still refused to accept Vilnius as part of Poland.

Ukrainians were also another people with strong anti-Polish hostility. The Polish–Ukrainian War of 1919 resulted in Ukraine crippled militarily and, though Poland did assist Ukraine in the eventual conflict against the Bolsheviks, but was unable to prevent an eventual occupation by the Soviets. This had led to enmity against Poland by Ukrainian nationalists, which resulted in the establishment of Organization of Ukrainian Nationalists and the beginning of Ukrainian problem in Poland. Assassinations of Polish officials by Ukrainian nationalists became increasingly frequent from 1930s onward.

== Invasion of Poland and World War II ==
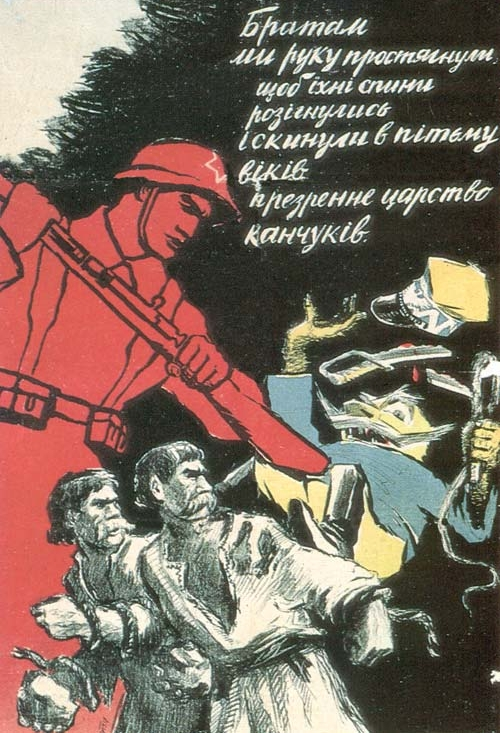
1939 Soviet poster. A Red Army soldier knocks a caricatured Polish general off backs of peasants armed with rocks

Nazi propagandists stereotyped Poles as nationalists in order to portray Germans as victims and justify the invasion of Poland; the Gleiwitz incident was a Nazi false flag to show that Germany was under Polish attack, and the killing of Germans by Poles in Bromberger Blutsonntag and elsewhere was inflated to 58,000 to increase German hatred of Poles and justify the killing of Polish civilians.

In October 1939, Directive No.1306 of Nazi Germany's Propaganda Ministry stated: "It must be made clear even to the German milkmaid that Polishness equals subhumanity. Poles, Jews and Gypsies are on the same inferior level. ... This should be brought home as a leitmotiv, and from time to time, in the form of existing concepts such as 'Polish economy', 'Polish ruin' and so on, until everyone in Germany sees every Pole, whether farm worker or intellectual, as vermin."

Historian Karol Karski writes that before World War II the Soviet authorities carried out a discreditation campaign against the Poles and describes Stalin as Polonophobe.

During World War II Poles became the subject of ethnic cleansing on an unprecedented scale, including: Nazi German genocide in General Government, Soviet executions and mass deportations to Siberia from Kresy, as well as massacres of Poles in Volhynia, a campaign of ethnic cleansing carried out in today's western Ukraine by Ukrainian nationalists. Among the 100,000 people murdered in the Intelligenzaktion operations in 1939–1940, approximately 61,000 were members of the Polish intelligentsia. Millions of citizens of Poland, both ethnic Poles and Jews, died in German concentration camps such as Auschwitz. Unknown numbers perished in Soviet "gulags" and political prisons. Reprisals against partisan activities were brutal; on one occasion 1,200 Poles were murdered in retaliation for the death of one German officer and two German officials. In August 2009 the Polish Institute of National Remembrance (IPN) researchers estimated Poland's dead (including Polish Jews) at between 5.47 and 5.67 million (due to German actions) and 150,000 (due to Soviet), or around 5.62 and 5.82 million total.

Soviet policy following their 1939 invasion of Poland in World War II was ruthless, and sometimes coordinated with the Nazis (see: Gestapo-NKVD Conferences). Elements of ethnic cleansing included Soviet mass executions of Polish prisoners of war in the Katyn Massacre and at other sites, and the exile of up to 1.5 million Polish citizens, including the intelligentsia, academics, priests and Jewish Poles to forced-labor camps in Siberia.

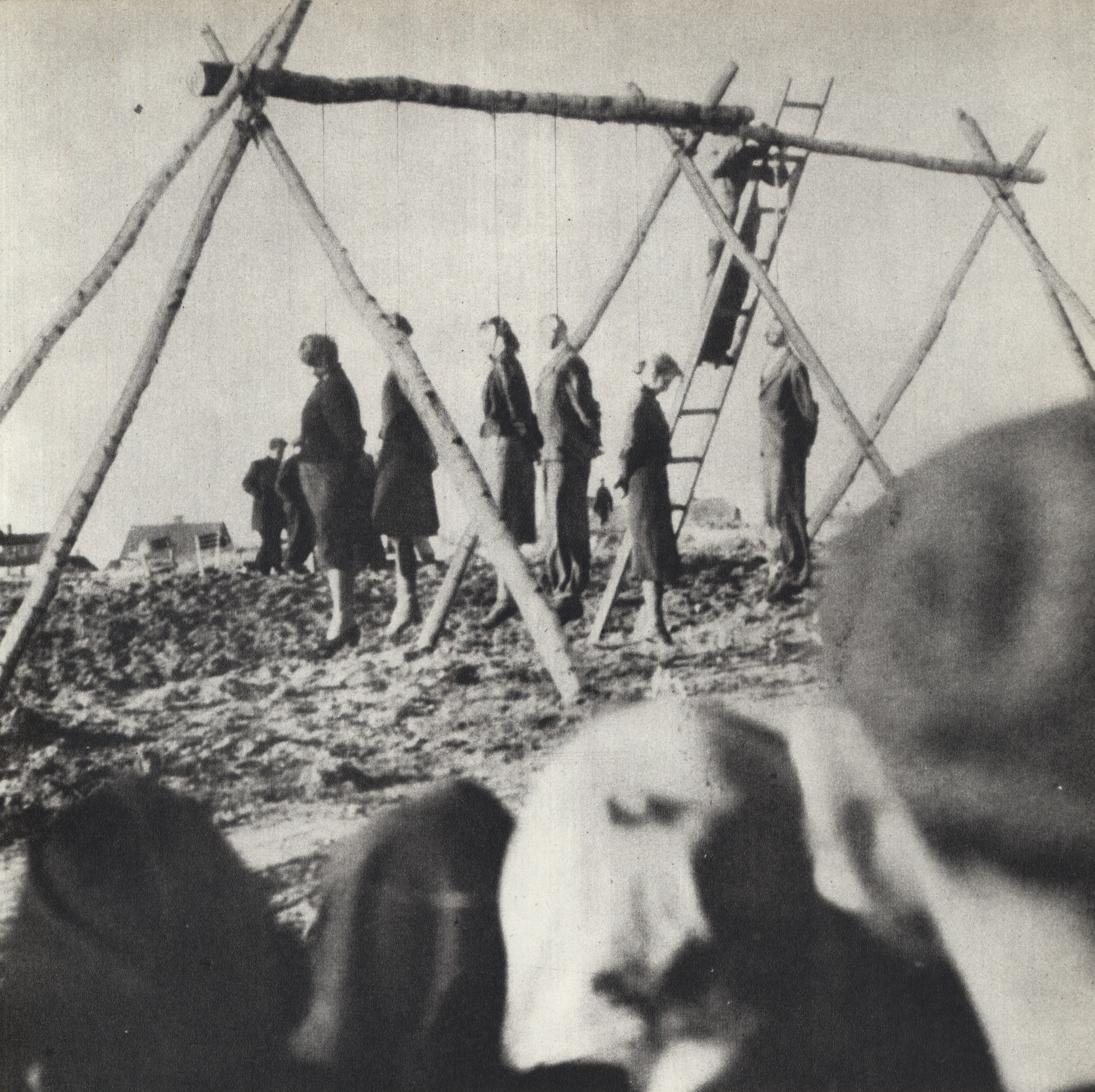
Public execution of Poles in Rożki, near Radom, in the German-occupied General Government, 1942

In German and Soviet war propaganda, Poles were mocked as inept for their military techniques in fighting the war. Nazi fake newsreels and forged pseudo-documentaries claimed that the Polish cavalry "bravely but futilely" charged German tanks in 1939, and that the Polish Air Force was wiped out on the ground on the opening day of the war. Neither tale was true (see: Myths of the Polish September Campaign). German propaganda staged a Polish cavalry charge in their 1941 reel called "Geschwader Lützow".

Ukrainian and Lithuanian nationalists utilized the increasing racial segregation to foment anti-Polonism. Followers of Stepan Bandera (also called Banderovites) committed genocide on Poles in Volhynia at 1943. Lithuanian forces often clash with Polish forces throughout the World War II, and committed massacre on Poles with support from the Nazis.

Bernard Montgomery often assigned blame to the failure of his operations, such as Operation Market Garden, to the Polish troops under his command. Poland's relationship with the USSR during World War II was complicated. The main western Allies, the United States and the United Kingdom, understood the importance of the Soviet Union in defeating Germany, to the point of refusing to condemn Soviet propaganda which vilified their Polish ally. The western Allies were even willing to help cover up the Soviet massacre at Katyn.

Zofia Kossak-Szczucka, the Catholic co-founder of Zegota, the Polish resistance group which risked the German death penalty to save Jews, and who herself was sent to Auschwitz, stereotyped Jews as haters of Poles even as she characterized Poles who remained silent in the face of the Holocaust as complicit:

German concentration-camp badge with letter "P"—required wear for Polish inmates

"The dying Jews are surrounded only by Pilates washing their hands of everything. This silence can no longer be tolerated. Whatever the incentives—it is despicable. Whoever is silent in the face of murder - becomes the murderer's accomplice. Who does not condemn—allows ...our feelings towards the Jews have not changed. We continue to think of them as Poland's political, ideological and economic enemies. What's more, we are aware that they hate us more than they hate the Germans, that they think us responsible for their tragedy. Why, on what ground—that remains a mystery of the Jewish soul."

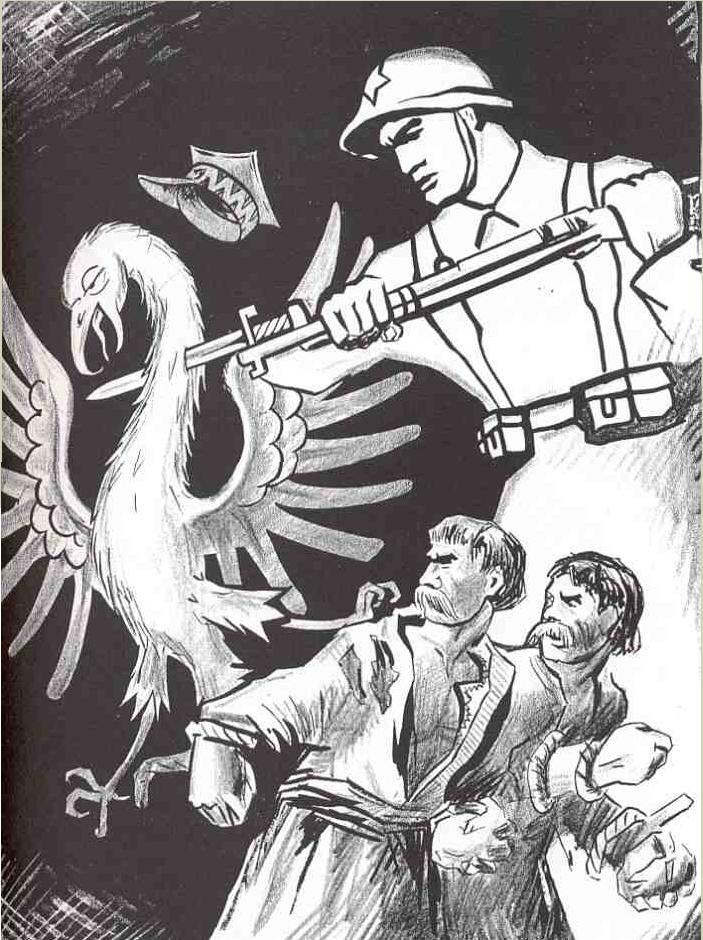
Soviet propaganda poster; the killing of the Polish Eagle in the east

== Post-war ==
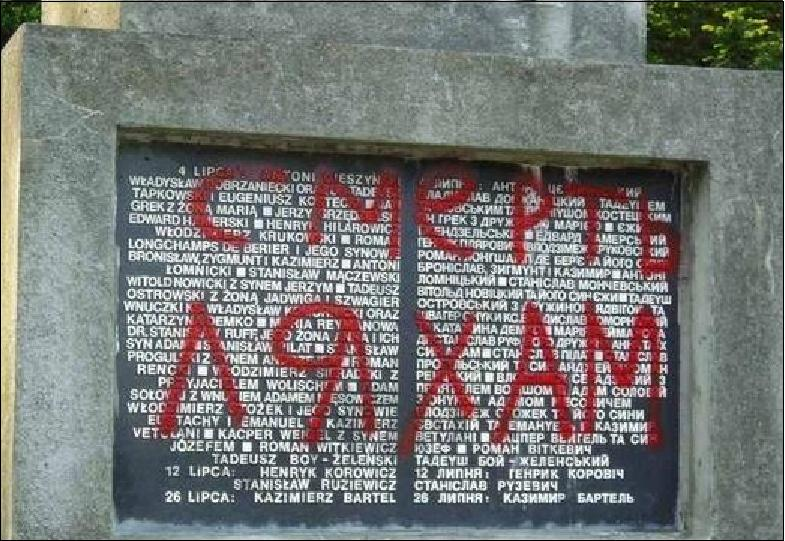
Memorial to Polish professors murdered by the Germans, Lviv, western Ukraine, with graffiti in Ukrainian: "Death to Poles!", November 2011

Under Joseph Stalin, thousands of soldiers of Poland's underground e.g. Home Army (Armia Krajowa) and returning veterans of the Polish Armed Forces that had served with the western Allies were imprisoned, tortured by Soviet NKVD agents (see: W. Pilecki, Ł. Ciepliński) and murdered following staged trials like the infamous Trial of the Sixteen in Moscow, Soviet Union. A similar fate awaited the "cursed soldiers". At least 40,000 members of Poland's Home Army were deported to Russia.

In Britain after 1945, the British populace accepted the Polish servicemen who chose not to return to a Poland ruled by the communist regime in their decision to stay on in Britain. The Poles resident in Britain served under British command during the war, but as soon as the Soviets began to make gains on the Eastern Front both public opinion and the government turned increasingly pro-Soviet. Socialist supporters of the Soviet Union made the Poles out to be "warmongers", "anti-Semites" and "fascists". After the war, the trade unions and Labour party played on the fears among the public of there not being enough jobs, food and housing to incite anti-Polish sentiments.

The myth that Poland had been conducting a genocide against ethnic Germans was invented in 1940 by German nationalist writer Edwin Erich Dwinger by embellishing the events of "Bloody Sunday". In 1961, a book was published in Germany entitled Der Erzwungene Krieg (The Forced War) by the American historical writer and Holocaust denier David Hoggan, which argued that Germany did not commit aggression against Poland in 1939, but was instead the victim of an Anglo-Polish conspiracy against the Reich. Reviewers have often noted that Hoggan seems to have an obsessive hostility towards the Poles. His claims included that the Polish government treated Poland's German minority far worse than the German government under Adolf Hitler treated its Jewish minority. In 1964, much controversy was created when two German right-wing extremist groups awarded Hoggan prizes. In the 1980s, the German philosopher and historian Ernst Nolte claimed that in 1939 Poland was engaged in a campaign of genocide against its ethnic German minority, and has strongly implied that the German invasion in 1939, and all of the subsequent German atrocities in Poland during World War II were in essence justified acts of retaliation. Critics, such as the British historian Richard J. Evans, have accused Nolte of distorting the facts, and have argued that in no way was Poland committing genocide against its German minority.

During the political transformation of the Soviet-controlled Eastern bloc in the 1980s, the traditional German anti-Polish feeling was again openly exploited in the East Germany against Solidarność. This tactic had become especially apparent in the "rejuvenation of 'Polish jokes,' some of which reminded listeners of the spread of such jokes under the Nazis."

== "Polish death camp" controversy ==
Several expressions offensive to Poles are attributed to a number of non-Polish media in relation to World War II. The most prominent is a continued reference by Western news media to "Polish death camps" and "Polish concentration camps". These phrases refer to the network of concentration camps operated by Nazi Germany in occupied Poland in order to facilitate the "Final Solution", but the wording suggests that the Polish people might have been involved. The Polish Ministry of Foreign Affairs, as well as Polish organizations around the world and all Polish governments since 1989, condemned the usage of such expressions, arguing that they suggest Polish responsibility for the camps. The American Jewish Committee stated in its 30 January 2005, press release: "This is not a mere semantic matter. Historical integrity and accuracy hang in the balance. ... Any misrepresentation of Poland's role in the Second World War, whether intentional or accidental, would be most regrettable and therefore should not be left unchallenged."

== In Polish–Jewish relations ==
There is a stereotype that Jews are anti-Polish. Cardinal Józef Glemp in his controversial and widely criticized speech delivered on 26 August 1989 (and retracted in 1991) argued that the outbursts of antisemitism are a "legitimate form of national self-defence against Jewish anti-Polonism." He "asked Jews who 'have great power over the mass media in many countries' to rein in their anti-Polonism because 'if there won't be anti-Polonism, there won't be such antisemitism among us'."

In November of the same year, Israeli Prime Minister Yitzhak Shamir said Poles "drink in (anti-Semitism) with their mother's milk." Polish Prime Minister Tadeusz Mazowiecki said that "these blanket statements are the most destructive actions imaginable," and that they "do irreparable harm" to people seeking Polish-Jewish reconciliation. Adam Michnik wrote for The New York Times that "almost all Poles react very sharply when confronted with the charge that Poles get their anti-Semitism 'with their mothers' milk'." Such verbal attacks – according to Michnik – are interpreted by anti-Semites as "proof of the international anti-Polish Jewish conspiracy".

In Rethinking Poles and Jews, Robert Cherry and Annamaria Orla-Bukowska said that anti-Polonism and antisemitism remain "grotesquely twinned into our own time. We cannot combat the one without combating the other."

The term "anti-Polonism" is said to have been used for campaign purposes by political parties such as the League of Polish Families (Polish: Liga Polskich Rodzin) or the defunct Self-Defence of the Republic of Poland (Polish: Samoobrona Rzeczpospolitej Polskiej) and organizations such as the Association against Anti-Polonism led by Leszek Bubel, leader of the Polish National Party and a former presidential candidate. Bubel was taken to court by a group of ten Polish intellectuals who filed a lawsuit against him for "violating the public good". Among the signatories were former Foreign Minister Władysław Bartoszewski and filmmaker Kazimierz Kutz.

According to Polish historian Joanna Michlic, the term is used in Poland also as an argument against the self-critical intellectuals who discuss Polish-Jewish relations, accusing them of "anti-Polish positions and interests." For example, historian Jan T. Gross has been accused of being anti-Polish when he wrote about crimes such as the Jedwabne pogrom. In her view, the charge is "not limited to arguments that can objectively be classified as anti-Polish—such as equating the Poles with the Nazis—but rather applied to any critical inquiry into the collective past. Moreover, anti-Polonism is equated with anti-Semitism."

For the 1994 anniversary of the Warsaw Uprising, a Polish Gazeta Wyborcza journalist, Michał Cichy, wrote a review of a collection of 1943 memoirs entitled Czy ja jestem mordercą? (Am I a murderer?) by Calel Perechodnik, a Jewish ghetto policeman from Otwock and member of the "Chrobry II Battalion", alleging (as hearsay) that about 40 Jews were killed by a group of Polish insurgents during the 1944 Uprising. Unlike the book (later reprinted with factual corrections), the actual review by Cichy elicited protests, while selected fragments of his article were confirmed by three Polish historians. Prof. Tomasz Strzembosz accused Cichy of practicing a 'distinct type of racism,' and charged Gazeta Wyborcza editor Adam Michnik with 'cultivating a species of tolerance that is absolutely intolerant of antisemitism yet regards anti-Polonism and anti-goyism as something altogether natural'." Michnik responded to the controversy, praising the heroism of the AK by asking: "Is it an attack on Polish people when the past is being explored to seek the truth?". Cichy later apologized for the tone of his article.

Polish historian Adam Leszczyński states that "Antisemitism is an extensive doctrine with racist or religious grounds that led to the Holocaust. 'Antipolonism' is at best a generalized aversion to Poles."

== "Polish jokes" ==
"Polish jokes" belong to a category of conditional jokes, meaning that their understanding requires knowledge of what a Polish joke is. Conditional jokes depend on the audience's affective preference—on their likes and dislikes. Though these jokes might be understood by many, their success depends entirely on the negative disposition of the listener.

Presumably the first Polish jokes by German displaced persons fleeing war-torn Europe were brought to the United States in the late 1940s. These jokes were fueled by ethnic slurs disseminated by German National Socialist propaganda, which attempted to justify the Nazis' murdering of Poles by presenting them as "dreck"—dirty, stupid and inferior. It is also possible that some early American Polack jokes from Germany were originally told before World War II in disputed border regions such as Silesia.

There is debate as to whether the early "Polish jokes" brought to states such as Wisconsin by German immigrants relate directly to the wave of American jokes of the early 1960s. A "provocative critique of previous scholarship on the subject" has been made by British writer Christie Davies in The Mirth of Nations, which suggests that "Polish jokes" did not originate in Nazi Germany but much earlier, as an outgrowth of regional jokes rooted in "social class differences reaching back to the nineteenth century." According to Davies, American versions of Polish jokes are an unrelated "purely American phenomenon" and do not express the "historical Old World hatreds of the Germans for the Poles. However, Hollywood in the 1960s and 1970s imported the subhuman-intelligence jokes about Poles from old Nazi propaganda."

For decades, Polish Americans have been the subject of derogatory jokes originating in anti-immigrant stereotypes that had developed in the U.S. before the 1920s. During the Partitions of Poland, Polish immigrants came to the United States in considerable numbers, fleeing mass persecution at home. They were taking the only jobs available to them, usually requiring physical labor. The same ethnic and job-related stereotypes persisted even as Polish Americans joined the middle class in the mid-20th century. "The constant derision, often publicly disseminated through the mass media, caused serious identity crises, feeling of inadequacy, and low self-esteem for many Polish Americans." In spite of the plight of Polish people under Cold War communism, negative stereotypes about Polish Americans endured.

Since the late 1960s, Polish American organizations have made continuous effort to challenge the negative stereotyping of the Polish people once prevalent in American media. The Polish American Guardian Society has argued that NBC-TV used the tremendous power of TV to introduce and push subhuman intelligence jokes about Poles (that were worse than prior simple anti-immigrant jokes) using the repetitive big lie technique to degrade Poles. The play called "Polish Joke" by David Ives has resulted in a number of complaints by the Polonia in the US. The "Polish jokes" heard in the 1970s were particularly offensive, so much so that the Polish Ministry of Foreign Affairs approached the U.S. State Department about that, however unsuccessfully. The syndrome receded only after Cardinal Karol Wojtyła was elected Pope, and Polish jokes became passé. Gradually, Americans have developed a more positive image of their Polish neighbors in the following decades.

In 2014, a German speaker joked during the European Aquatics Championships that the Polish team would be coming back home in "our cars".

== Today ==
=== United Kingdom ===
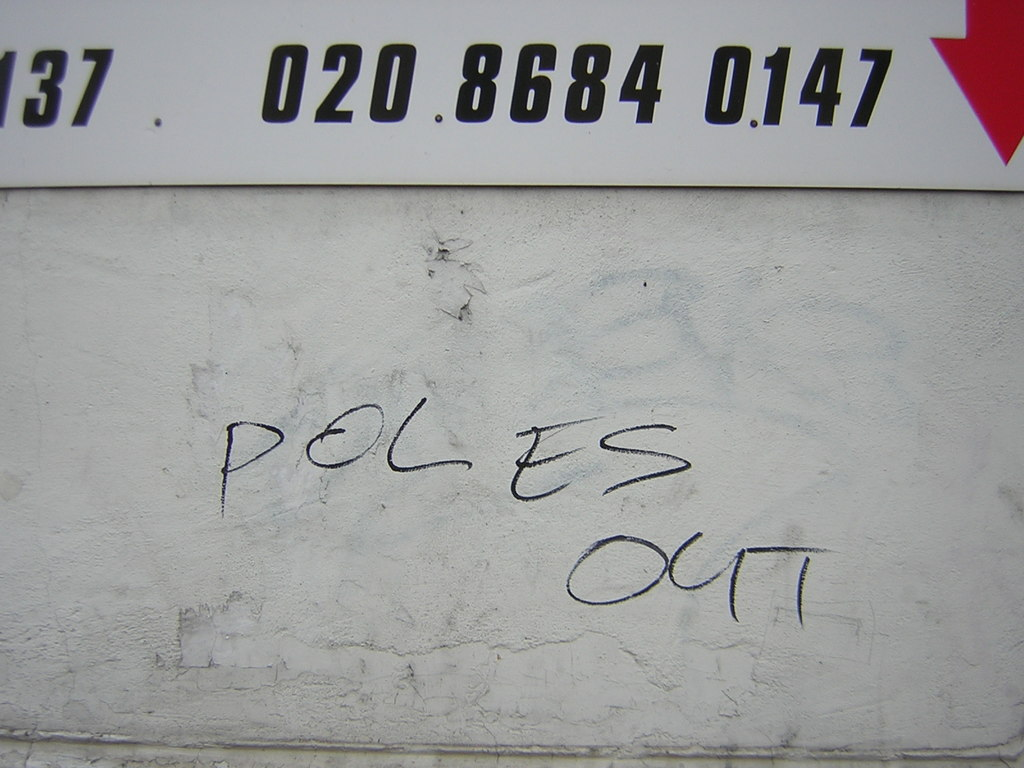
Anti-Polish graffiti in Thornton Heath, 2011

Since the EU enlargement in 2004, where ten new countries joined in the single-largest expansion to date (Cyprus, Czech Republic, Estonia, Hungary, Latvia, Lithuania, Malta, Poland, Slovakia and Slovenia), the UK has experienced mass immigration from Poland (see Poles in the United Kingdom). It is estimated that the Polish British community has doubled in size since 2004; with Poland now having overtaken India as the largest foreign-born country of origin in 2015 (831,000 Poles to 795,000 Indian-born persons). Anti-Polish sentiment in the UK is often related to the issue of immigration. There have been some instances of anti-Polish sentiment and hostility towards Polish immigrants. The far-right British National Party argued for immigration from (Central and) Eastern Europe to be stopped and for Poles to be deported.

In 2007, Polish people living in London reported 42 ethnically motivated attacks against them, compared with 28 in 2004. The Conservative MP Daniel Kawczynski, of Polish origin himself, said in 2008 that the increase in violence towards Poles was in part "a result of the media coverage by the BBC" whose reporters "won't dare refer to controversial immigration from other countries." Kawczynski voiced his criticism of the BBC in the House of Commons for "using the Polish community as a cat's paw to try to tackle the thorny issue of mass, unchecked immigration" only because against Poles "it's politically correct to do so."

In 2009, the Federation of Poles in Great Britain and the Polish Embassy in London with Barbara Tuge-Erecinska raised a number of formal complaints – including with the Press Complaints Commission – about news articles in the Daily Mail, which the Federation claimed "displayed anti-Polish sentiment". The newspaper denied this was its intention, and the PCC brokered a settlement between the parties.

The Guardian has been noted for a number of other controversies. On 14 October 2009, Nazi-hunter Efraim Zuroff alleged that: "the second world war narrative [...] has been distorted since independence and the transition to democracy to make it more palatable to their electorate and to minimize the role of local collaborators in Holocaust crimes." On 20 October 2009, The Guardian's Jonathan Freedland said: "We are meant to be friendly towards the newest members of the European Union. But the truth is that several of these "emerging democracies" have reverted to a brand of ultra-nationalistic politics that would repel most voters in western Europe. It exists in Poland". In response to the above articles, Timothy Garton Ash wrote in the same paper on 23 December: "In my experience, the automatic equation of Poland with Catholicism, nationalism and antisemitism – and thence a slide to guilt by association with the Holocaust – is still widespread. This collective stereotyping does no justice to the historical record."

Also in 2008, the Polish ambassador sent an official protest to the Press Complaints Commission about The Times. On 26 July 2008, Giles Coren published a comment piece with the ethnic slur 'Polack' used to describe Polish immigrants. He accused Poland of complicity in the six million Jewish deaths of The Holocaust, prompting not only an official letter of complaint to The Times, but also an early day motion in the British parliament, followed by an editorial in The Economist. The ambassador, Tuge-Erecinska, explained that the article was "unsupported by any basic historic or geographic knowledge," and that "the issue of Polish-Jewish relations has been unfairly and deeply falsified" by Coren's "aggressive remarks" and "contempt". Coren reacted by telling The Jewish Chronicle: "Fuck the Poles". The case was later referred to the European Court of Human Rights. However, the case was unsuccessful as Poles are not classified as an ethnic minority. The editor of The Jewish Chronicle, Stephen Pollard, commented on 6 August 2009: "There are few things more despicable than anti-Semitism, but here's one of them: using a false charge of anti-Semitism for political gain."

On 6 October 2009, Stephen Fry was interviewed by Jon Snow on Channel 4 News as a signatory of a letter to then-Conservative Party leader David Cameron expressing concern about the party's relationship with the right-wing Polish Law and Justice Party in the European Parliament. During the interview, Fry stated: "There has been a history, let's face it, in Poland of a right-wing Catholicism which has been deeply disturbing for those of us who know a little history, and remember which side of the border Auschwitz was on..." The remark prompted a complaint from the Polish Embassy in London, as well as an editorial in The Economist and criticism from British Jewish historian David Cesarani. Fry later posted an apology on his personal weblog, in which he stated: "It was a rubbishy, cheap and offensive remark that I have been regretting ever since. ... I take this opportunity to apologize now." On 30 October 2009, the Chief Rabbi of Poland, Michael Schudrich, complained about this new British political row playing on a "'false and painful stereotype that all Poles are antisemitic', whereas the truth was that the problem was around the same there as elsewhere in Europe."

In January 2014, a Polish man, whose helmet was emblazoned with the flag of Poland, claimed he was attacked by a group of fifteen men outside a pub in Dagenham, London. Photos were taken of him and his motorbike. The victim blamed xenophobic speeches of the Conservative Prime Minister David Cameron. During the same month in Belfast there was seven attacks on Polish houses within ten days, in which stones and bricks were thrown at the windows.

Following the British referendum of EU membership, there were more cases of Polonophobic occurrences including anti-Polish hatemail sent to Polish shops and racist leaflets distributed in Huntingdon, as well as graffiti painted on the Polish Cultural Centre in Hammersmith.

Central and Eastern European pupils, including the Polish ones, have experienced increased levels of xenophobic bullying since the Brexit vote.

Anti-Polish sentiment in the UK has been the subject of an academic study.

=== Israel ===
The politician Yair Lapid said that his father's grandmother, who was killed in the Auschwitz concentration camp, "was murdered in Poland by Germans and Poles". Lapid also wrote that there were "Polish death camps" (see Polish death camps controversy).

In a 2018 interview, Anna Azari, the Israeli ambassador to Poland, said that "We need to work to reduce anti-Semitism, but work is also needed for there to be less anti-Polish sentiment" and "Anti-Polonism occurs not only in Israel, but also in Jewish circles outside Israel."

In February 2019, Poland's prime minister Mateusz Morawiecki canceled plans for his country to send a delegation to a meeting in Jerusalem on Monday after the acting Israeli foreign minister, Israel Katz said, "Poles collaborated with the Nazis, definitely. Collaborated with the Nazis. As (former Israeli Prime Minister) Yitzhak Shamir said—his father was murdered by Poles—he said that from his point of view they sucked anti-Semitism with their mothers' milk. You can't sugarcoat this history." Zvi Bar, an Israeli brigadier general and politician, said that Katz was speaking as a 'student' of Yitzhak Shamir, "the father of Polish genetic theory" and said: "All right, there were Poles and Hungarians who collaborated, there were and are anti-Semitic Poles and Hungarians. But why generalize? Why be racist, why accuse these nations and attribute to them inherent anti-Semitic characteristics?"

On 15 May 2019, Poland's Ambassador to Israel, Marek Magierowski, was spat on and attacked outside the Embassy of Poland, Tel Aviv by a 65-year-old Israeli architect, Arik Lederman, who was arrested following the assault. Israeli Foreign Ministry spokesman Emmanuel Nahshon said: "We express our fullest sympathy to the ambassador and our shock at the attack," while the suspect apologized and said he had been provoked earlier by a Polish Embassy employee using an antisemitic slur against him. The Polish embassy in turn disputed the man's account, and said it has CCTV evidence to disprove it.

=== United States ===
On 14 November 2007, Fox aired an episode of Back to You created by Christopher Lloyd and Steven Levitan called "Something's Up There", which contained a controversial anti-Polish slur. The slur involved Marsh trying to convince the show's lone Polish-American character, Gary, to go bowling after work by saying: "Come on, it's in your blood, like kielbasa and collaborating with the Nazis." Fox later apologised on 20 November 2007. It vowed never to broadcast the line of dialogue again either in repeats and/or syndicated broadcasts. Fox stated that, "The line was delivered by a character who is known for being ignorant, clueless, and saying outlandish things. Allowing the line to remain in the show, however, demonstrated poor judgment, and we apologise to anyone who was offended."

=== Russia ===
In August 2005, a series of allegedly organised attacks against Polish diplomats took place in Moscow, which prompted the then-Polish President Aleksander Kwaśniewski to call on the Russian Government to stop them. An employee with the Polish embassy in Moscow was hospitalised in serious condition after being assaulted in broad daylight near the embassy by unidentified men. Three days later, another Polish diplomat was beaten up near the embassy. The following day the Moscow correspondent for the Polish daily Rzeczpospolita was attacked and beaten up by a group of Russians. It is widely believed that the attacks were organized as revenge for the mugging of four Russian youth in a public park in Warsaw by a group of skinheads, several days earlier.

The professional volleyball player Aleksey Spiridonov has publicly repeated extreme Polonophobic statements which have been widely cited in Russia.

=== Lithuania ===
The former "Solidarity" leader and Polish President Lech Wałęsa criticised the Lithuanian Government over discrimination against the Polish minority, which included the enforced Lithuanization of Polish surnames and the removal of bilingual Polish language street signs (despite Lithuanian laws not permitting such signs) in municipalities with predominantly Polish-speaking population. In 2011, Wałęsa rejected Lithuania's Order of Vytautas the Great citing the mistreatment of the Polish minority.

=== Ukraine ===
In his 2007 book Heroes and Villains, in the context of bitter Polish-Ukrainian relations concerning the mutual massacres during World War II, David R. Marples asserted that (at the time of the writing of the book) there were "no Ukrainian organizations and press organs that specialize in anti-Polish propaganda". However different interpretations of these bitter World War II events have led to a sharp deterioration of the relations between the nations since 2015. In April 2017 the Ukrainian Institute of National Remembrance forbade the exhumation of Polish victims of the 1943 massacres of Poles in Volhynia and Eastern Galicia as part of the broader action of halting the legalization of Polish memorial sites in Ukraine, in a retaliation for the dismantling of a monument to UPA soldiers in Hruszowice, Eastern Poland.

Polish President Andrzej Duda expressed his concerns with appointment to high Ukrainian offices of people expressing nationalistic anti-Polish views. The Ukrainian foreign ministry stated that there is no general anti-Polish sentiment in Ukraine. In 2017, Polish Foreign Minister Witold Waszczykowski announced plans to bar Ukrainians with anti-Polish views, as a reaction to the disrespect to the Polish cemetery in Lviv.

=== Germany ===
Following the accession of Poland to the European Union, Germany–Poland relations have improved. In 2016, Martin Schulz, a German Social Democrat, criticized the Duda's government in Poland and referred it as a "coup". This had led to criticism in Poland, although Polish government had downplayed the issue. In 2020, President of Poland Andrzej Duda accused German media of misinterpreting his words and the German government for being Polonophobe regarding coverage about 2020 Polish presidential election.

=== Netherlands ===
In February 2012, Geert Wilders's Freedom Party launched a "hotline" to collect complaints about Poles and other Eastern Europeans. The website caused criticism from politicians for being "anti-Polish". The Polish embassy in the Netherlands requested the Dutch government to shut down the website.

A 2015 survey showed that 49% of new Polish arrivals in the Netherlands have had to deal with discrimination.
