= Taras Bulba =

1835 romanticized historical novella by Nikolai Gogol

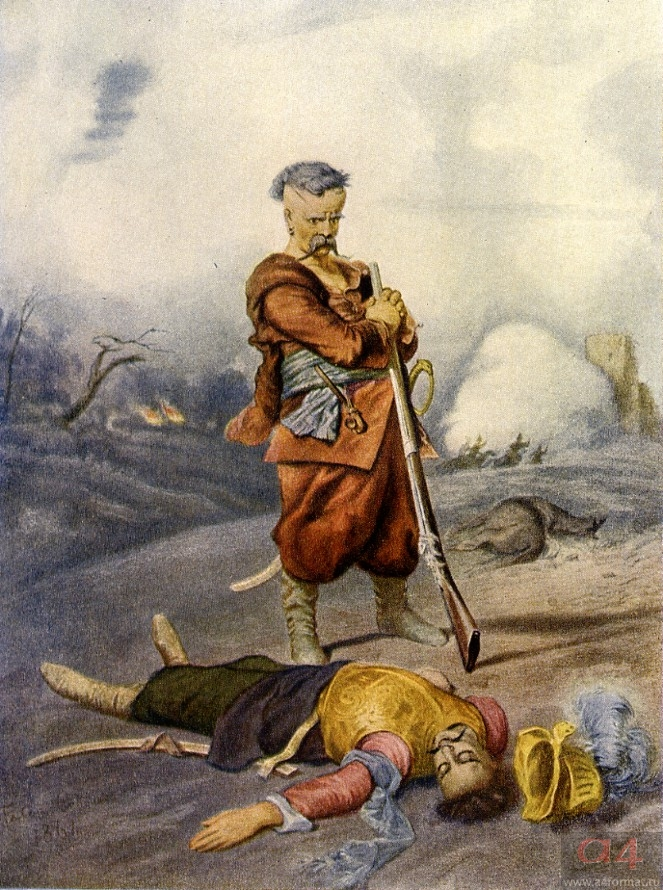
- Illustration for the novel by Pyotr Sokolov, 1861
- Author: Nikolai Gogol
- Language: Russian
- Genre: Historical novel, novella
- Publication date: 1835 (1st as part of a collection)

Taras Bulba (Russian: «Тарас Бульба», romanized: Tarás Búl'ba) is a romanticized historical novella set in the first half of the 17th century, written by Nikolai Gogol (1809–1852). It features the elderly Zaporozhian Cossack Taras Bulba and his sons Andriy and Ostap. The sons study at the Kiev Academy and then return home, whereupon the three men set out on a journey to the Zaporizhian Sich (the Zaporizhian Cossack headquarters, located in southern Ukraine) where they join other Cossacks and go to war against Poland.

The story was initially published in 1835 as part of the Mirgorod collection of short stories, but a much expanded version appeared in 1842 with some differences in the storyline. The twentieth-century critic Victor Erlich described the 1842 text as a "paragon of civic virtue and a force of patriotic edification", contrasting it with the rhetoric of the 1835 version with its "distinctly Cossack jingoism".

== Inspiration ==
The character of Taras Bulba, the main hero of this novel, is a composite of several historical personalities. It might be based on the real family history of an ancestor of Nicholas Miklouho-Maclay, Cossack Ataman Okhrim Makukha from Starodub, who killed his son Nazar for switching to the Polish side for treason, during the Khmelnytsky Uprising. Nicholas Miklouho-Maclay's uncle, Grigory Illich Miklouho-Maclay, studied together with Gogol in Nizhyn Gymnasium (officially Prince Bezborodko's Gymnasium of Higher Learning, today Nizhyn Gogol State University) and probably told the family legend to Gogol. Another possible inspiration was the hero of the folk song "The deeds of Sava Chaly", published by Mykhailo Maksymovych, about Cossack captain Sava Chaly (executed in 1741 after serving as a colonel in the private army of a Polish noble), whose killing was ordered by his own father for betraying the Ukrainian cause.

== Plot ==
=== 1842 revised edition ===
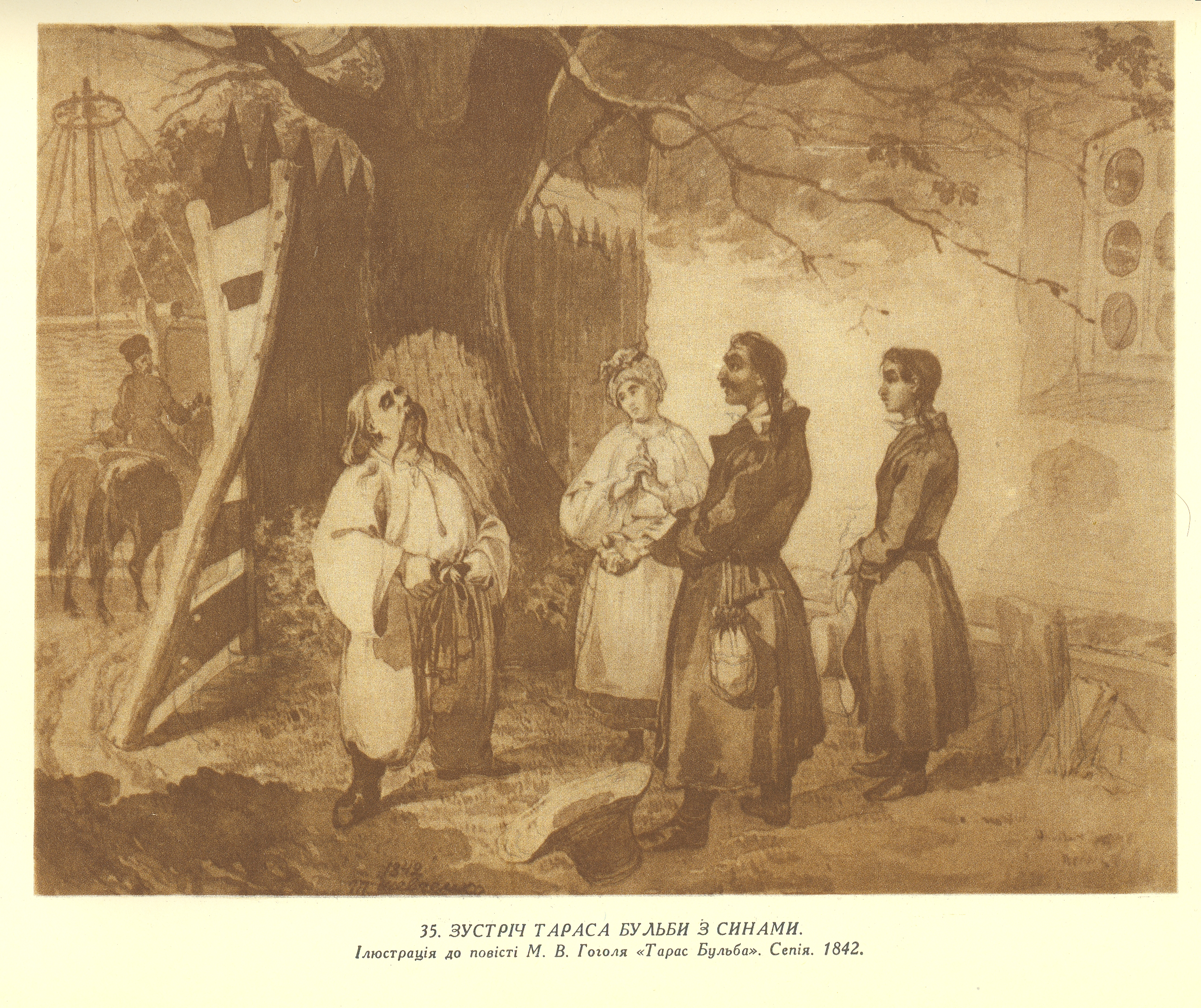
Meeting of Taras Bulba with sons. Illustration by Taras Shevchenko (1842)

Taras Bulba's two sons, Ostap and Andriy, return home from an Orthodox seminary in Kiev. Ostap is the more adventurous, whereas Andriy has deeply romantic feelings of an introvert. While in Kiev, he fell in love with a young Polish noble girl, the daughter of the Voivode of Kowno, but after a couple of meetings (edging into her house and in church), he stopped seeing her when her family returned home. Taras Bulba gives his sons the opportunity to go to war. They reach the Cossack camp at the Zaporozhian Sich, where there is much merrymaking. Taras attempts to rouse the Cossacks to go into battle. He rallies them to replace the existing Hetman when the Hetman is reluctant to break the peace treaty.

They soon have the opportunity to fight the Poles, who rule all Ukraine west of the Dnieper River. The Poles, led by their ultra-Catholic king, are accused of atrocities against Orthodox Christians, in which they are aided by Jews. After killing many of the Jewish merchants at the Sich, the Cossacks set off on a campaign against the Poles. They besiege Dubno Castle where, surrounded by the Cossacks and short of supplies, the inhabitants begin to starve. One night a Tatar woman comes to Andriy and rouses him. He finds her face familiar and then recalls she is the servant of the Polish girl he was in love with. She advises him that all are starving inside the walls. He accompanies her through a secret passage starting in the marsh that goes into the monastery inside the city walls. Andriy brings loaves of bread with him for the starving girl and her mother. He is horrified by what he sees and in a fury of love, forsakes his heritage for the Polish girl.

Meanwhile, several companies of Polish soldiers march into Dubno to relieve the siege, and destroy a regiment of Cossacks. A number of battles ensue. Taras learns of his son's betrayal from Yankel the Jew, whom he saved earlier in the story. During one of the final battles, he sees Andriy riding in Polish garb from the castle and has his men draw him to the woods, where he takes him off his horse. Taras bitterly scolds his son, telling him "I gave you life, I will take it", and shoots him dead.

Taras and Ostap continue fighting the Poles. Ostap is captured while his father is knocked out. When Taras regains consciousness he learns that his son was taken prisoner by the Poles. Yankel agrees to take Taras to Warsaw, where Ostap is held captive, hiding Taras in a cartload of bricks. Once in Warsaw, a group of Jews help Yankel dress Taras as a German count. They go into the prison to see Ostap, but Taras unwittingly reveals himself as a Cossack, and only escapes by use of a great bribe. Instead, they attend the execution the following day. During the execution, Ostap does not make a single sound, even while being broken on the wheel, but, disheartened as he nears death, he calls aloud on his father, unaware of his presence. Taras answers him from the crowd, thus giving himself away, but manages to escape.

Taras returns home to find all of his old Cossack friends dead and younger Cossacks in their place. He goes to war again. The new Hetman wishes to make peace with the Poles, which Taras is strongly against, warning that the Poles are treacherous and will not honour their words. Failing to convince the Hetman, Taras takes his regiment away to continue the assault independently. As Taras predicted, once the new Hetman agrees to a truce, the Poles betray him and kill a number of Cossacks. Taras and his men continue to fight and are finally caught in a ruined fortress, where they battle until the last man is defeated.

Taras is nailed and tied to a tree and set aflame. Even in this state, he calls out to his men to continue the fight, claiming that a new Tsar is coming who will rule the earth. The story ends with Cossacks on the Dniester River recalling the great feats of Taras and his unwavering Cossack spirit.

=== Differences from 1835 edition ===
For reasons that are currently disputed, the 1842 edition was expanded by three chapters and included Russian nationalist themes. Potential reasons include a necessity to stay in line with the official tsarist ideology, as well as the author's changing political and aesthetic views (later manifested in Dead Souls and Selected Passages from Correspondence with his Friends). The changes included three new chapters and a new ending (in the 1835 edition, the protagonist is not burned at the stake by the Poles).

== Ethnic depictions ==
=== Depiction of Jews ===
Felix Dreizin and David Guaspari in their The Russian Soul and the Jew: Essays in Literary Ethnocentrism discuss anti-Semitism, pointing out Gogol's attachment to "anti-Jewish prejudices prevalent in Russian and Ukrainian culture". In Léon Poliakov's The History of Antisemitism, the author states that "The 'Yankel' from Taras Bulba indeed became the archetypal Jew in Russian literature. Gogol painted him as supremely exploitative, cowardly, and repulsive, albeit capable of gratitude". There is a scene in Taras Bulba where Jews are thrown into a river, a scene where Taras Bulba visits the Jews and seeks their aid, and reference by the narrator of the story that Jews are treated inhumanely.

=== Depiction of Poles ===
Following the 1830–1831 November Uprising against Russian imperial rule in the heartland of Poland – partitioned since 1795 – the Polish people became the subject of an official campaign of discrimination by the Tsarist authorities. "Practically all of the Russian government, bureaucracy, and society were united in one outburst against the Poles. The phobia that gripped society gave a new powerful push to the Russian national solidarity movement" – wrote historian Liudmila Gatagova. According to her, it was in this particular context that many of Russia's literary works and popular media of the time became hostile toward the Poles in accordance with the state policy, especially after the emergence of the Panslavist ideology, accusing them of betraying the "Slavic family". According to sociologist and historian Prof. Vilho Harle, Taras Bulba, published only four years after the rebellion, was a part of this anti-Polish propaganda effort. Inadvertently, Gogol's accomplishment became "an anti-Polish novel of high literary merit, to say nothing about lesser writers."

=== Depiction of Turks ===
As in other Russian novels of the era, Turks are treated as barbaric and uncivilized compared to Europeans because of their nomadic nature.

== Adaptations ==
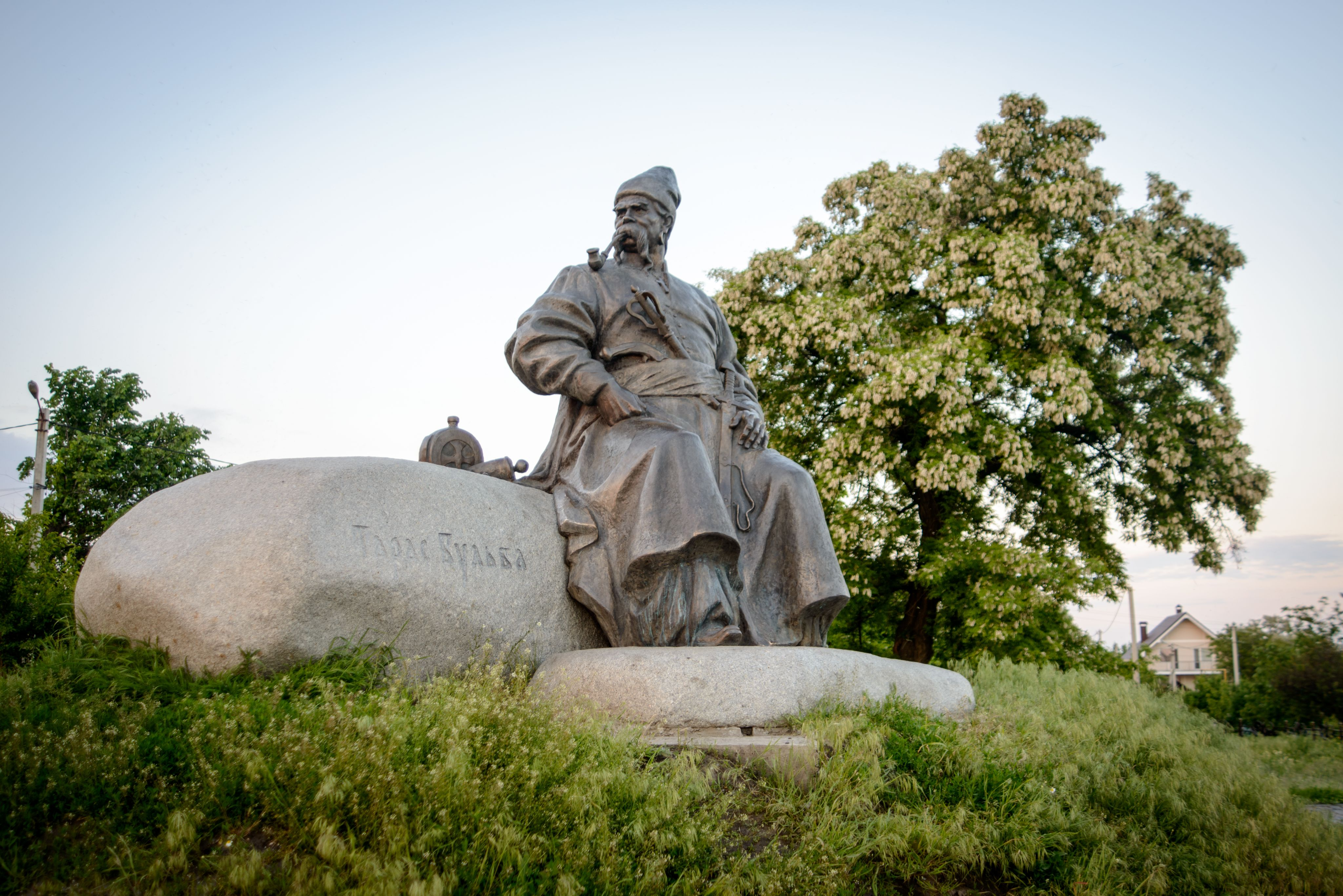
Taras Bulba Memorial in Keleberda, Ukraine

Music

- The story was the basis of an opera, Taras Bulba, written between 1880–1891, by Ukrainian composer Mykola Lysenko. It was published in 1913, and first performed in 1924 (12 years after the composer's death). The opera's libretto was written by Mykhailo Starytsky, the composer's cousin. Tchaikovsky had been impressed with it, and wanted to stage it in Moscow, but Lysenko insisted that it be performed in Ukrainian (not translated into Russian), so Tchaikovsky wasn't able to get it staged in Moscow.
- Czech composer Leoš Janáček's Taras Bulba, a symphonic rhapsody for orchestra, was written in the years 1915–1918, inspired in part by the mass slaughter of World War I. The composition was first performed on 9 October 1921 by František Neumann, and in Prague on 9 November 1924 by Václav Talich and the Czech Philharmonic Orchestra.
- Reinhold Glière wrote a ballet in Four Acts in 1951–52, published as Opus 92, to commemorate the centenary of the death of Gogol. The ballet was one of Glière's last completed works. It was first performed and published in 1952.
- Franz Waxman wrote an Oscar-nominated score for the 1962 film Taras Bulba.

Film

- Taras Bulba (1909), a silent film adaptation, directed by Aleksandr Drankov
- Taras Bulba (1924), made in Germany by the Russian exile Joseph N. Ermolieff
- Taras Bulba (1936), a French production, directed by Russian director Alexis Granovsky, with noted decor by Andrei Andreyev
- The Rebel Son (1938), a British film starring Harry Baur with a supporting cast of significant British actors
- Taras Bulba (1962), an American adaption starring Yul Brynner and Tony Curtis and directed by J. Lee Thompson; featured a significant musical score by Franz Waxman, which received an Academy Award nomination. Bernard Herrmann called it "the score of a lifetime".
- Taras Bulba, the Cossack, a 1962 Italian film version
- Taras Bulba (2009), directed by Vladimir Bortko, commissioned by the Russian state TV and paid for totally by the Russian Ministry of Culture. It includes Ukrainian, Russian and Polish actors such as Bohdan Stupka (as Taras Bulba), Ada Rogovtseva (as Taras Bulba's wife), Igor Petrenko (as Andriy Bulba), Vladimir Vdovichenkov (as Ostap Bulba) and Magdalena Mielcarz (as a Polish noble girl). The movie was filmed at several locations in Ukraine such as Zaporizhzhia, Khotyn and Kamianets-Podilskyi during 2007. The screenplay used the 1842 edition of the novel.
- Duma about Taras Bulba (2009), a Ukrainian film.
- Veer (2010), a Hindi movie set in 19th century India, is based in part on the plot of Taras Bulba.

== In popular culture ==
- An Australian racehorse of the 1970s was named Taras Bulba. From 40 starts he had 12 wins, including the 1974 Australian Derby and won $335,000 in prize money.
- The 2007 Jane Smiley book Ten Days in the Hills features a film producer trying to film a new version of Taras Bulba.
- The villainous character Taurus Bulba (an anthropomorphic bull) in the Disney cartoon show Darkwing Duck is a nod, if in name only, to the literary character of Taras Bulba.
- In the 2002 video game No One Lives Forever 2: A Spy in H.A.R.M.'s Way, Cate Archer (controlled by the player) finds a copy of Taras Bulba by Nikolai Gogol when searching a vanquished foe.
- In 2007, a copy of the book is part of the literature selected by Christopher McCandless in the movie Into the Wild among other similar works of authors such as Leo Tolstoy, Henry David Thoreau and Jack London.

== See also ==
With Fire and Sword by Henryk Sienkiewicz
