= Pilot (Back to You) =

- Back to You episode
- Chuck and Kelly shoot their first promo since Chuck's return to WURG
- Episode no.: Season 1 Episode 1
- Directed by: James Burrows
- Written by: Steven Levitan; Christopher Lloyd
- Production code: BTY-101
- Original air date: September 19, 2007

Guest appearances
- Spencer Knowles as Mail Boy; Adam Busch as Production Assistant; Michael Richard Robinson as Weatherman; Erin Ross as Darcy Tanner

Episode chronology
← Previous —	Next → "Fish Story"

"Pilot" is the first episode of the first season of the situation comedy Back to You. It aired on September 19, 2007.

== Plot ==
In the 90s, Chuck Darling moves from his anchor post at a small T.V. markets news program in Pittsburgh to a much larger market in Denver.

Ten years later, Chuck is in L.A. and is fired after inadvertently going off on a profanity-filled rant that becomes widespread via online outlets (Kelly states that she saw it on YouTube).

Soon after, Chuck's back in Pittsburgh and reuniting with his former co-anchor, Kelly Carr, much to her protest; however, sports correspondent Marsh McGinley is thrilled.

Later, the reason behind Chuck and Kelly's friction is revealed. They slept together on a drunken New Year's Eve which resulted in Chuck becoming the father of Kelly's 10-year-old daughter. Chuck meets his daughter, Gracie, although he does not tell her that he is her father. At the end of the episode, Chuck calls Kelly, telling her that Gracie is spectacular.

== Production details ==
Creators Levitan and Lloyd wrote the script for "Pilot", signed Grammer and Heaton, and brought in Burrows before approaching any of the networks.

The scene which features Chuck explaining to Kelly his various promotions was re-shot between the filming for the pilot episode and the original broadcast of the episode. Fox featured clips featuring the original scene during promos for the Pilot.

== Reception ==
Tim Goodman of the San Francisco Chronicle described it as a "retro-sitcom" due to its multiple cameras and studio audience. Charlie McCollum of the Mercury News felt that Back to You is this "season's highest-profile attempt to revitalize the traditional sitcom."

Mike Duffy of the Detroit Free Press felt that the first two episodes of Back to You found a "quality groove" and delivered laughs. He described the shows news studio as a "natural for loopy, literate good fun" and thought that Grammer and Heaton made a good team. Vinay Menon of The Toronto Star felt that based on the first two episodes, Back to You had elements in common with NewsRadio, Just Shoot Me!, Murphy Brown, and The Mary Tyler Moore Show.

"Pilot" debuted on a "highly competitive night", in terms of ratings.
