= Back to You (TV series) =

American television sitcom (2007–2008)

- Genre: Sitcom
- Created by: Christopher Lloyd; Steven Levitan
- Directed by: James Burrows
- Starring: Kelsey Grammer; Patricia Heaton; Ayda Field; Laura Marano; Lily Jackson; Josh Gad; Ty Burrell; Fred Willard
- Theme music composer: Adam Anders
- Composer: Paul Buckley
- Country of origin: United States
- Original language: English
- No. of seasons: 1
- No. of episodes: 17

Production
- Executive producers: Christopher Lloyd; Steven Levitan; James Burrows; Kelsey Grammer
- Producer: Maggie Randell-Blanc
- Production locations: Pittsburgh, 20th Century Fox Studios, Los Angeles, CA
- Editor: Ron Volk
- Camera setup: Multi-camera
- Running time: 30 minutes
- Production companies: Picture Day Productions; 20th Century Fox Television

Original release
- Network: Fox
- Release: September 19, 2007 – May 14, 2008

Back to You is an American sitcom that was produced by Picture Day Productions and 20th Century Fox Television and aired on Fox from September 19, 2007, to May 14, 2008. The creators and executive producers were Christopher Lloyd and Steven Levitan, and the director was James Burrows. The series starred Kelsey Grammer and Patricia Heaton as squabbling anchors of a news program.

== Plot ==
Chuck Darling (Grammer) and Kelly Carr (Heaton) were co-anchors of Pittsburgh news program WURG News 9 that had great on-screen chemistry, despite constant quarreling off-screen. However, Chuck left to take a job elsewhere. After an embarrassing comment he makes results in his dismissal from a large market LA newscast, Chuck returns to Pittsburgh after 10 years to become an anchor on the newscast he originally left. Chuck also learns that he is the father of Carr's 10-year-old daughter. Their daughter, Gracie, turns 11 years old in the episode, "Something's Up There".

== Characters ==
- Chuck Darling (Kelsey Grammer) is the co-anchor at WURG-TV, News 9, and also the former co-anchor of WURG until New Year's Eve 1996, until he left for a better job, moving through different markets before finally moving to an anchor job in Los Angeles. Ten years later, he made a curse-filled outburst towards a co-worker, Darcy Tanner, which became a massive YouTube sensation. He has now returned to WURG-TV and is once again co-anchor with Kelly Carr. He later finds out he has a child with Kelly named Gracie, a result of a one-night stand the night before he left. He and Gracie get along well, and despite the fact that Gracie is oblivious to his paternity, it seems that Chuck has passed on some of his personality traits to his daughter, which include their mutual dislike for Kelly. He was raised in Greenwich, Connecticut.
- Kelly Marsha Carr (Patricia Heaton) is Chuck's co-anchor, and was formerly until New Year's Eve 1996 when he left WURG. As a result of getting drunk while doing a report on drunk driving, and later having sex with Chuck, she now has a daughter she conceived with him. When Chuck returned, she wasn't happy, taking every chance to get angry with him. She revealed that her daughter Gracie is in fact Chuck's child.
- Montana Diaz Herrera (real name Sally Lerner) (Ayda Field) was WURG's purportedly Latina weatherwoman until episode 13 when she was fired. Montana isn't the most well-educated person, but she will do a lot to make sure people in power like her. She also has a difficulty pronouncing "Monongahela". Her name has disappeared from the credits as of episode 10, because in the plot line for episode 13, she was fired. It is revealed her real name is Sally Lerner. She pretended to be Hispanic because most stations "only wanted to hire minorities." She chose the alias Montana because it was where she used to ice skate, and she chose Diaz Herrera only after mistaking it for "Happy Days" in Spanish. It has been alluded that she is Marsh's daughter. Montana/Sally's mother is named Louise Lerner.
- Ryan Church (Josh Gad) is the news director at WURG. He stated in the pilot that he is 26 (and a half) years old, and his birthday falls in the month of March. He also has a crush on Montana, and repeatedly tries to impress her by doing stupid and dangerous things. He formerly ran the station's internet division.
- Gracie Carr (Laura Marano then Lily Jackson) is Chuck and Kelly's daughter, though she was unaware that Chuck is her father until episode 11. She and her father Chuck seem to share many qualities, such as their sense of humor and their allergy to pistachios. She recently turned eleven. Lily Jackson replaced Laura Marano starting with the tenth episode, "The Wall of Fame", and Gracie reverted to the age of 10.
- Gary Crezyzewski (pronounced "Sure-shwoov-ski") (Ty Burrell) is WURG's field reporter, a position he has held for 12 years. His ambition is to become an anchor, and it has been hinted that he holds a grudge against Chuck because Gary hoped to be the new anchor. He always ends up in awkward and unwanted situations while reporting, which have included, as he explains, "every freeway chase, toxic spill, and record snowfall". He was also seen to have been used as a test subject in a taser demonstration. His name is often mis-pronounced by his co-workers, especially Chuck. Gary is married to a woman named Kitty, and their marriage is described as somewhat antagonistic, but loving. Kitty is often mentioned, and usually described as behaving outlandishly, but is never seen on camera – much like Maris from Frasier or Vera from Cheers, both programs from Back to You producer Christopher Lloyd. Gary is of Polish descent.
- Marsh McGinley (Fred Willard) is WURG's fairly dim-witted sports anchor. He throws up before the beginning of each show. He also breaks down while reading "Casey at the Bat", because his father used that poem to break his stutter. Could possibly be the father of Montana.

=== Guest stars ===
- Adam Busch as Production Assistant
- Bill Macy as Troy
- Regan Burns as Mr. Robbins
- Rick Fitts as David
- Maurice G. Smith as Stage Manager
- Tia Carrere as Maggie
- Bill Ratner as Announcer
- Charisma Carpenter as Brooke
- Paul Butcher as Well-Dressed Kid
- Tricia O'Kelley as Colette
- Jed Rees as George
- James Patrick Stuart as Chad Brackett
- Billy Mayo as Policeman
- Hailee Steinfeld as little girl

== Episodes ==
No.	Title	Directed by	Written by	Original release date	Prod. code
1	"Pilot"	James Burrows	Steven Levitan & Christopher Lloyd	September 19, 2007	1ANX79
Chuck Darling returns to his old Pittsburgh TV news co-anchor job, re-partnering with his former co-anchor Kelly Carr.
2	"Fish Story"	James Burrows	Dan O'Shannon	September 26, 2007	1ANX01
Chuck is given a fish and attempts to use it as an opportunity to prove to Kelly he can handle responsibility.
3	"First Supper"	James Burrows	Gail Lerner	October 3, 2007	1ANX02
When Chuck's dinner date is called off, he meets Kelly and Gracie at a nearby restaurant and awkwardly joins them for a meal. Chuck and Gracie bond as they swap offensive quips about Kelly. Despite her disdain, Kelly starts to think having Chuck around wouldn't be such a bad thing after all. Meanwhile at WURG-TV, Marsh helps Gary create a promo after some failed attempts; Montana learns about her broken relationship while she is on the air and Ryan has to hide his infatuation for her in time for the night's broadcast.
4	"A Gentleman Always Leads"	James Burrows	Christopher Lloyd	October 10, 2007	1ANX03
After hearing some of his old friends, who used to work at WURG, talking about him getting fired in Los Angeles, Chuck tries to prove he's still got what it takes to be a big network anchor. As the night's lead story continues to change, Chuck and Kelly argue over who will be taking the lead story, Chuck knowing his old friends will be watching the broadcast. Kelly finally ends up giving the lead story to Chuck, but unknown to him, the victim of the bear attack, which was the lead story, has a helium sounding voice. Also, after stealing Montana's intern to work in the Sports Department, Marsh tries to find her a replacement. When the intern is older than they both expected, Montana and Marsh must figure out how to fire him.
5	"A Night of Possibilities"	James Burrows	Andy Gordon	October 17, 2007	1ANX04
Kelly accuses Chuck of being selfish and rude after he declines a dinner invitation from Ryan in order to reinstate a Friday tradition, his "night of possibilities", in which he does five activities: goes for a walk, smokes a Cuban cigar, drinks a scotch, has a steak, and "Destiny knocks". In rebuttal, Chuck states that Kelly is uptight and rigid. The pair try to prove each other wrong leading Chuck to go to dinner with Ryan and Kelly going for a night out with Montana. Meanwhile, Gary tries carpooling with Marsh, who is a disaster waiting to happen while behind the wheel.
6	"Gracie's Bully"	James Burrows	Jeffrey Richman	November 7, 2007	1ANX05
Gracie's class take a field trip to WURG and Kelly tells Chuck that Gracie has been having problems with a bully. While Kelly tries to take the rational approach to dealing with the problem, by calling the school principal and organizing a conflict resolution session, Chuck tells Gracie to take the problem into her own hands with a more corporeal approach. This leads to Kelly taking Chuck's advice and threatening the bully, Xander. Meanwhile, Marsh tries to prove to Gary he can read the poem "Casey at the Bat" to the children without crying. Also, Montana has to deal with a precocious young weathergirl, who upstages her when the young weathergirl can successfully pronounce Monongahela River, and Ryan encounters a younger version of himself.
7	"Something's Up There"	James Burrows	Steven Levitan	November 14, 2007	1ANX06
A vicious raccoon causes havoc at Gracie's birthday party.
8	"Cradle to Grave"	James Burrows	Abraham Higginbotham & Steven Levitan	February 26, 2008	1ANX09
Kelly attends a funeral of a former anchor and leaves Chuck to babysit Gracie.
9	"Business or Pleasure"	James Burrows	Sally Bradford	February 27, 2008	1ANX07
Another anchor from a rival news program asks Kelly out on a date, which makes Chuck jealous. Meanwhile, Gary chastises the members of Anthrocon
10	"Wall of Fame"	James Burrows	Andy Gordon	April 16, 2008	1ANX12
When Marsh decides to throw Chuck a surprise party, Chuck and Kelly discover an incriminating photograph on Marsh's wall portraying them in a compromising position in the background and they try to find a way to remove it without anyone's knowledge. Meanwhile, Gary and Ryan stumble into Marsh and Peg's bedroom and are disturbed by what they see.
11	"Hug & Tell"	James Burrows	Gail Lerner & Chuck Tatham	April 23, 2008	1ANX13
Everyone's favorite security guard hugs everybody else but won't hug Gary.
12	"Two Steps Forward, One Step Back"	James Burrows	Christopher Lloyd & Dan O'Shannon	April 30, 2008	1ANX14
When Gracie reacts badly to the announcement that Chuck is her father, Chuck and Kelly remember the night Gracie was conceived.
13	"The New Boss"	James Burrows	Sally Bradford & Jeffrey Richman	May 7, 2008	1ANX10
Shockwaves reverberate through the newsroom, as major changes are expected when a tenacious station manager (played by Suzy Nakamura) takes over at WURG. Meanwhile, Gary worries about taking a much needed vacation under the new regime.
14	"Chuck and Kelly, Doin' It Again"	James Burrows	Story by : Chuck Tatham; Teleplay by : Steven Levitan & Jeffrey Richman	May 14, 2008	1ANX15
In the First Season Finale, Chuck and Kelly seek the best way to publicly disclose their parenthood, but an unfortunately timed new ad campaign for the station complicates their efforts. Meanwhile, Marsh bestows a gift upon Gary but immediately regrets his generosity.
15	"Date Night"	James Burrows	Gail Lerner	July 2, 2008 (Australia) (Note: This episode was released in the United States as part of the series' DVD set.)	1ANX08
After Chuck accuses Kelly of dating a rival anchor because he's a younger version of himself, Kelly gets even by redirecting a dinner invitation Chuck intended for a specific co-worker. When both couples end up dining at the same restaurant, the evening turns into a showdown. Gary and Marsh help Ryan get ready for his cyber date with Shelley (Jayma Mays) a girl from New Mexico.
16	"House of Tomorrow"	James Burrows	Abraham Higginbotham	July 9, 2008 (Australia) (Note: This episode was released in the United States as part of the series' DVD set.)	1ANX11
Chuck decides to buy a state-of-the-art technologically-advanced house, while Kelly vacillates between liking and hating the new, more mature Chuck. Meanwhile, Gary wants the chief weatherman position, which is now vacant since Montana was fired.
17	"Hostage Watch"	James Burrows	Chuck Tatham	July 31, 2008 (Australia) (Note: This episode was released in the United States as part of the series' DVD set.)	1ANX16
The team brainstorm ways to increase their ratings. Meanwhile, there is a hostage situation at the local bank and the gunman insists Chuck Darling must act as the mediator.

== Production history ==
=== Conception ===
It was reported in January 2007 that Kelsey Grammer and Patricia Heaton were in talks to lead the cast of the series, originally titled Action News, which only had a script commitment with 20th Century Fox Television at the time. The script was reportedly a hot commodity with numerous networks interested before Fox outbid the competition and gave it a blind thirteen-episode commitment in February 2007. Upon its pickup, it also became Levitan and Lloyd's first project under their production banner, Levitan-Lloyd Productions. Grammer and Heaton were also confirmed to star in the series in the same month. It was renamed Back to You in April 2007 because Pittsburgh has a real life Channel 4 Action News. (The show was originally to be set in Buffalo, New York, which, at least in name, did not have an Action News station, but Lloyd felt that having a major-market news personality fall from Los Angeles (market #2) to Buffalo (market #49) was implausible. This was despite the fact that several prominent Los Angeles news anchors, including John Beard, Nick Clooney, Maria Genero, Kevin O'Connell, Brian Kahle, and John Stehlin have all moved from the Los Angeles to the Buffalo markets; all but Clooney and Stehlin remain there to this day, though Kahle has since died, and Stehlin has moved to an even smaller market in neighboring Erie, Pennsylvania.) The series was officially greenlit on May 11, 2007. James Burrows, who had directed all the episodes of the show joined the staff as an executive producer in June 2007.

Produced by 20th Century Fox Television and Levitan-Lloyd Productions, the series premiered on September 19, 2007. The show aired on Wednesday nights at 8:30/7:30c on Fox, leading out 'Til Death, which features Heaton's former Everybody Loves Raymond co-star, Brad Garrett. The first episode rated a promising 9.44 million viewers for Fox.

On October 24, 2007, the show was picked up for an additional 11 episodes, bringing the total number of episodes to 24.

Also, despite the show's cancellation, and no guarantee of its renewal, Channel 4 in the United Kingdom picked up the show. The series premiered in the UK on Wednesday, June 11, 2008, on More4 at 9.30 pm. It then moved onto Channel 4 on early morning weekdays comedy slot at 8:00.

=== Production notes ===
Back to You was filmed at 20th Century Fox Studios in Los Angeles.

=== Casting ===
After the first two leads were found, Paul Campbell and Aimee Garcia were originally cast as Ryan Church and Montana Diaz Herrera respectively in February 2007 but the roles were re-cast in April 2007 with Josh Gad and Ayda Field replacing them. Fred Willard was also cast as Marsh McGinley in February. Casting continued throughout March with Ty Burrell and Laura Marano landing the last two regular spots in the series. There was also talk of casting Sung Hi Lee in a recurring role as Chuck Darling's love interest, but the producers decided in April to go in a different direction. She did appear in the Pilot.

The role of Gracie Carr was re-cast starting the tenth episode, "The Wall of Fame", and was played by Lily Jackson. Ayda Field was also dropped from the show after the tenth episode. The background used for Ayda Field's credit in the title sequence, a weather map of the United States, was still briefly shown but her image was replaced by a silhouette of a man.

=== Writers' strike ===
Production on the show was halted on November 6, 2007, due to the 2007–2008 Writers Guild of America strike.

The show went on hiatus on November 14 but returned on Tuesday, February 26, 2008, at 9:30/8:30c. It aired a new episode that night and another on Wednesday, February 27, 2008, the following day, and new episodes began airing weekly, starting Wednesday April 16, 2008. On this day, Back to You moved to its new time slot at 8:00/7:00c, following 'Til Death, and replacing The Moment of Truth.

=== Cancellation ===
Despite having better ratings and reviews than its comedy companion 'Til Death, the series was not renewed by Fox on May 9, 2008, while 'Til Death was renewed.

The comedy was shopped around for a new home, at Grammer's request, and CBS was interested in picking up the comedy for a second season. CBS was also interested in using the comedy to open an extension night of comedy beyond Monday night, giving the series as a solid anchor for the extension.

However, Grammer was already searching for a new show and ABC had given him some new projects (one was an overseas remake of Roman's Empire, which failed to pick up, and Hank, which premiered Fall 2009, but was cancelled after five episodes). Heaton also was interested in an ABC project (The Middle, which also premiered in fall 2009 and lasted for nine seasons, until May 2018). As a result, Back to You was never renewed.

In a somewhat related note, the creators of the show, Lloyd & Levitan, would go on to create another fall 2009 series for ABC, Modern Family, which features fellow Back to You star Burrell, as well as Willard as Burrell's character's father, and even airs after The Middle (which aired after Hank from September–November 2009). When originally pitching their show, Lloyd & Levitan never offered Modern Family to Fox because of their issues dealing with that network over Back to You.

== Reception ==
=== Critical reaction ===
Back to You received generally mixed reviews, receiving a rating of 58 from Metacritic.

- I'd rather just watch Grammer and Heaton trade barbs in the newsroom. – Entertainment Weekly
- Fox's Back to You is back to TV comedy basics: multiple cameras, live audiences but, mostly, laughs. — Los Angeles Times
- Grammer and Heaton slip easily into characters who won't be easily mistaken for Frasier Crane or Debra Barone, the writing's professional, the supporting cast dependable (and in the case of Fred Willard, another Raymond veteran, dependably hilarious). – Philadelphia Daily News
- You have to admire Kelsey Grammer and Patricia Heaton for holding up their end of the bargain, even if the material in their show, Back to You, is such a drop from "Frasier" and "Everybody Loves Raymond". – The Philadelphia Inquirer
- The pilot's plot leads them in a direction where "this just in" becomes an obvious sexual metaphor — some of it is funny, but there's just too much. – Pittsburgh Post-Gazette
- Absolutely nothing about it is original or seeks to transform the half-hour genre. Still, the fact that it is executed by sure-footed comedy veterans more than makes up for the sin of familiarity. – Seattle Post-Intelligencer

=== Controversy ===
The episode "Something's Up There" (aired November 14, 2007) involved Marsh trying to convince the show's lone Polish-American character, Gary, to go bowling after work by saying: "Come on, it's in your blood, like kielbasa and collaborating with the Nazis." Fox later apologized on November 20, 2007. They vowed never to air the line of dialogue again in repeats and/or syndicated broadcasts. Fox stated that, "The line was delivered by a character known for being ignorant, clueless, and for saying outlandish things. Allowing the line to remain in the show, however, demonstrated poor judgment, and we apologize to anyone who was offended."

== U.S. television ratings ==
Season	Timeslot	Season premiere	Season finale	TV season	Ranking	Viewers (in millions)
1st	Wednesday 8:00 pm	September 19, 2007	May 14, 2008	2007–2008	#109	6.54

== DVD release ==
Season 1
Set Details		Special Features
17 episodes; 3-disc set; 16:9 aspect ratio; Languages: English; English subtitles; Spanish subtitles; French subtitles		Behind the Scenes with Back to You Featurette; This Just in Featurette; Gag Reel Featurette
Release Dates		Behind the Scenes with Back to You Featurette; This Just in Featurette; Gag Reel Featurette
Region 1	Region 4	Behind the Scenes with Back to You Featurette; This Just in Featurette; Gag Reel Featurette
October 14, 2008	October 22, 2008	Behind the Scenes with Back to You Featurette; This Just in Featurette; Gag Reel Featurette

Back to You is also available on the iTunes Store, featuring the fourteen episodes that aired on the Fox network.
