= Something's Up There =

- Back to You episode
- The WURG team try to capture the raccoon.
- Episode no.: Season 1 Episode 7
- Directed by: James Burrows
- Written by: Steven Levitan
- Production code: BTY-107
- Original air date: November 14, 2007

Guest appearance
- David Jahn as Jenna's Dad

Episode chronology
← Previous "Gracie's Bully"	Next → "Cradle to Grave"

"Something's Up There" is the seventh episode of the first season of the situation comedy Back to You. It aired on November 14, 2007. This episode is also known for its controversial content.

== Reception ==
=== Controversies ===
After the airing of the episode, a scene involving Marsh trying to convince the show's lone Polish character, Gary, to go bowling after work by saying: "Come on, it's in your blood, like Kielbasa and collaborating with the Nazis." caused controversy among some Poles and Polish-Americans. The characterisation of all Poles as having collaborated with the invading German Nazis offended many Poles, who felt that such mockery was unacceptable in light of the Polish casualties during WW2. Many felt that it also ignored the millions of Poles who fought against the Nazis for six years during World War II, compared to the thousands who collaborated with them.

Fox later delivered a public apology on November 20, 2007. They vowed never to air the line of dialog again in repeats and/or syndicated broadcasts. Fox stated, "The line was delivered by a character known for being ignorant, clueless and for saying outlandish things. Allowing the line to remain in the show, however, demonstrated poor judgment, and we apologize to anyone who was offended."

Furthermore, some critics and many viewers noticed that a large part of the plot was taken from a popular story from the radio program This American Life.
