= Liudmila Gatagova =

Liudmila Sultanovna Gatagova (Russian: Людмила Султановна Гатагова) is a Russian historian, essayist, and the Research Fellow at the Institute of History of the Russian Academy of Sciences of Ossetian descent, specializing in international relations and history of the Russian Empire and the Caucasus until the Revolution of 1917, including the crystallization of the Russian national identity and the accompanied ethnic conflicts within the state.

Gatagova was a 1999 Awardee of the Grant for Projects in the Humanities by the American Council of Learned Societies, "doing exemplary work in the humanities during a time of crisis and contraction."

== Bibliography ==
- Contributor: Ethnic and National Issues in Russian and East European History. Edited by John Morison, 2000, ISBN 978-0-333-69550-0
- Contributor: Religion and identity in modern Russia: the revival of orthodoxy and Islam. By Benjamin Forest, Juliet Johnson. Ashgate Publishing, 2005, ISBN 0-7546-4272-0
- Liudmila Gatagova, "Iudofobiia: summa zol," 4 September 2009 (in Russian)
- Contributor: Russian Studies in History, 43/2, 2004
