= Vilho Harle =

Finnish professor (born 1947)

Vilho Harle (born 1947 in Nilsiä) is a Professor of International Relations at University of Lapland in Finland. He was a visiting fellow in 1996–1997 at the Centre for International Studies, the London School of Economics and Political Science. Harle specializes in analysis of concepts of social order in different cultures, including their moral principles and political structures. He has authored or edited more than ten books and scientific journal issues, including Ideas of Social Order in the Ancient World (Greenwood Press, 1998). In his books, Prof. Vilho Harle conducts studies of culturally significant philosophical, religious and literary works that propagate these ideas.

By delimiting a theme in Western political thought and history that constructs the "I" and the "thou" in terms of good and evil, the book [Enemy with a Thousand Faces by Vilho Harle] identifies and delimits a tendency to portray the Other as an enemy, evil incarnate dehumanized by a combination of religious and political ideas. The tradition of understanding the Self and the Other as the vehicles of good and evil is reproduced in thought, speech, and action and constitutes a continuous tradition from ancient Iranian Zoroastrianism, through Judaism, Christianity, and Islam. — David Boucher, Cardiff University

== Selected works ==
- Vilho Harle, The Enemy with a Thousand Faces: The Tradition of the Other in Western Political Thought and History, Greenwood Publishing, March 2000, ISBN 0-275-96141-9 Hardcover
- Vilho Harle, Ideas Of Social Order In The Ancient World, Greenwood Publishing, 1998, ISBN 0-313-30582-X Hardcover
- Vilho Harle, Challenges and Responses in European Security, TAPRI, 1986, ISBN 0-566-05363-2 Hardcover
- Vilho Harle, Essays in Peace Studies, Ashgate Publishing, 1987, ISBN 0-566-05375-6 Hardcover
- Vilho Harle (Editor), Nuclear Weapons in a Changing Europe, 1991 Hardcover
- Vilho Harle (Editor), Political Economy of Food, 1978 Hardcover
