= Bixby's Back =

- Modern Family episode
- Episode no.: Season 2 Episode 14
- Directed by: Chris Koch
- Written by: Danny Zuker
- Production code: 2ARG16
- Original air date: February 9, 2011

Guest appearances
- Reid Ewing as Dylan; Jeremy Rowley as Broderick; James Greene as Elderly gentleman

Episode chronology
← Previous "Caught in the Act"	Next → "Princess Party"
- Modern Family season 2

"Bixby's Back" is the 14th episode of the second season of the American comedy television series, Modern Family and the 38th episode overall. It originally aired February 9, 2011 on the American Broadcasting Company (ABC). The episode was written by Danny Zuker, and directed by Chris Koch.

In the episode, Claire and Phil decide to reprise their role-playing adventure from the previous Valentine's Day episode, "My Funky Valentine". Jay's elaborate Valentine's surprise for Gloria keeps getting held up. An admirer comes between Cameron and Mitchell.

"Bixby's Back" received generally mixed reviews from critics with many saying it was an inadequate sequel to "My Funky Valentine". Despite the mixed reviews, the episode was viewed by 13.16 million households, according to the Nielsen Media Research, and received a 5.1 rating among adults between the ages of 18 and 49, tying the spot for highest-rated episode of the series at that time with "The Old Wagon" and "Halloween". It later became the most viewed scripted program of the week among 18- to 49-year-old adults.

== Plot ==
At the Dunphy house, Phil (Ty Burrell) and Claire (Julie Bowen) decide to have a small dinner for Valentine's Day in order to avoid the disastrous results of the events of last year. Since they only could get a very early dinner reservation, Claire realizes that all the couples are elderly so she decides to bring back their characters from last year, Clive Bixby and Julianna. Julianna has Clive ditch his wife and meet her at their hotel. At the bar, Claire gives Phil the key to her room. While watching Claire walk way, Phil takes the wrong room key belonging to an older woman who was arranging her purse. He enters the wrong room, sprinkles rose petals on the bed, undresses, and waits on the bed with a bottle of champagne. The older woman then walks in after coming back from the bar. Back at the house, Phil and Claire decide to just act like themselves.

Haley's (Sarah Hyland) boyfriend David blows her off to study for a big exam. Manny (Rico Rodriguez) expects to profit from Haley being free from both David and Dylan (Reid Ewing) and manages to convince Haley to send David a break-up email. She feels liberated for a brief moment but then her ex-boyfriend Dylan shows up with his band on a flatbed of a truck and he sings a love song to her. Haley rushes into Dylan's arms and thus Manny's hopes of wooing Haley are dashed.

Meanwhile, Cameron (Eric Stonestreet) suspects Mitchell's new assistant, Broderick (Jeremy Rowley), has a crush on Mitchell (Jesse Tyler Ferguson), which he denies but secretly affirms. His suspicion is soon proven wrong when Broderick hugs Cameron in an elevator revealing that he is the real object of his desire. While eating dinner together, Cameron reveals this to Mitchell, who still believes Broderick has a crush on him. To see which one is right, the two go to Broderick's house, but after getting a text from Broderick which says he is quitting, the two decide it would be best if they never knew which one of them Broderick liked.

Jay (Ed O'Neill) plans out a perfect Valentine's surprise for Gloria (Sofía Vergara). He hires a chef to prepare her a luxurious meal at their house, but must keep Gloria away while the chef is setting up. Jay takes Gloria to a great restaurant that she loves, with the intent to leave after pretending to find that his secretary had forgotten to make a reservation. Unfortunately his plan goes awry; at the restaurant there really is a reservation for two under the name Pritchett, so they have to stay much to Gloria's delight and Jay's flabbergasted anguish. Later, the reservation turns out to have been for Cameron and Mitchell, so the relieved and elated Jay and furious Gloria have to leave again.

Back at their house, the two have a fight and Gloria refuses to go inside. She is so angry she wants to get in her car and take a drive to cool down. Jay has no choice but to carry the screaming Gloria into the house for her surprise dinner. When the two finally go into the house, however, Jay is stunned to find the house empty. Gloria goes to the garage to take her car out for her drive with Jay following. As the garage door opens we see the romantic surprise dinner is, for some reason, taking place in the garage. Gloria reveals that she had figured out Jay's secret plan, moved it to the garage, and bought him a new motorcycle which sits beside the dinner table.

== Production ==
"Bixby's Back" was written by Danny Zuker, his sixth writing credit for the series. The episode was directed by Chris Koch, his third credit for the series. The episode is considered a sequel to the first season episode, "My Funky Valentine".

Many plots of the episode were revealed before the episode's airdate by TV Guide writers Adam Bryant and Natalie Abrams. It originally aired on February 9, 2011 on the American Broadcasting Company. "Bixby's Back" was filmed between January 5, and January 17, 2011.

The episode also featured the return of Reid Ewing's character, Dylan, after he broke up with Haley. Julie Bowen said in an interview with TV Guide at the 17th Screen Actors Guild Awards that, "This year's Valentine's Day episode is pretty insane, It's different than last year's. Clive and Julianna are back, but Clive is in the more compromising position this time instead of Julianna."

== Reception ==
=== Ratings ===
In its original American broadcast, "Bixby's Back" was viewed by an estimated 13.16 million viewers according to the Nielsen Media Research, and received a 5.1 rating/13% share among adults between the ages of 18 and 49. This means that it was seen by 5.1% of all 18- to 49-year-olds, and 13% of all 18- to 49-year-olds watching television at the time of the broadcast. This episode of Modern Family saw an increase of 9 percent from the previous episode, "Caught in the Act". The episode became the highest-rated episode of the series, tying with "The Old Wagon" and "Halloween". The episode also ranked first in its timeslot and became the second highest-rated program on Wednesday after American Idol. "Bixby's Back" was the most-watched scripted show for the week of broadcast among adults aged 18–49, and the ninth most-watched show among all viewers.

=== Reviews ===
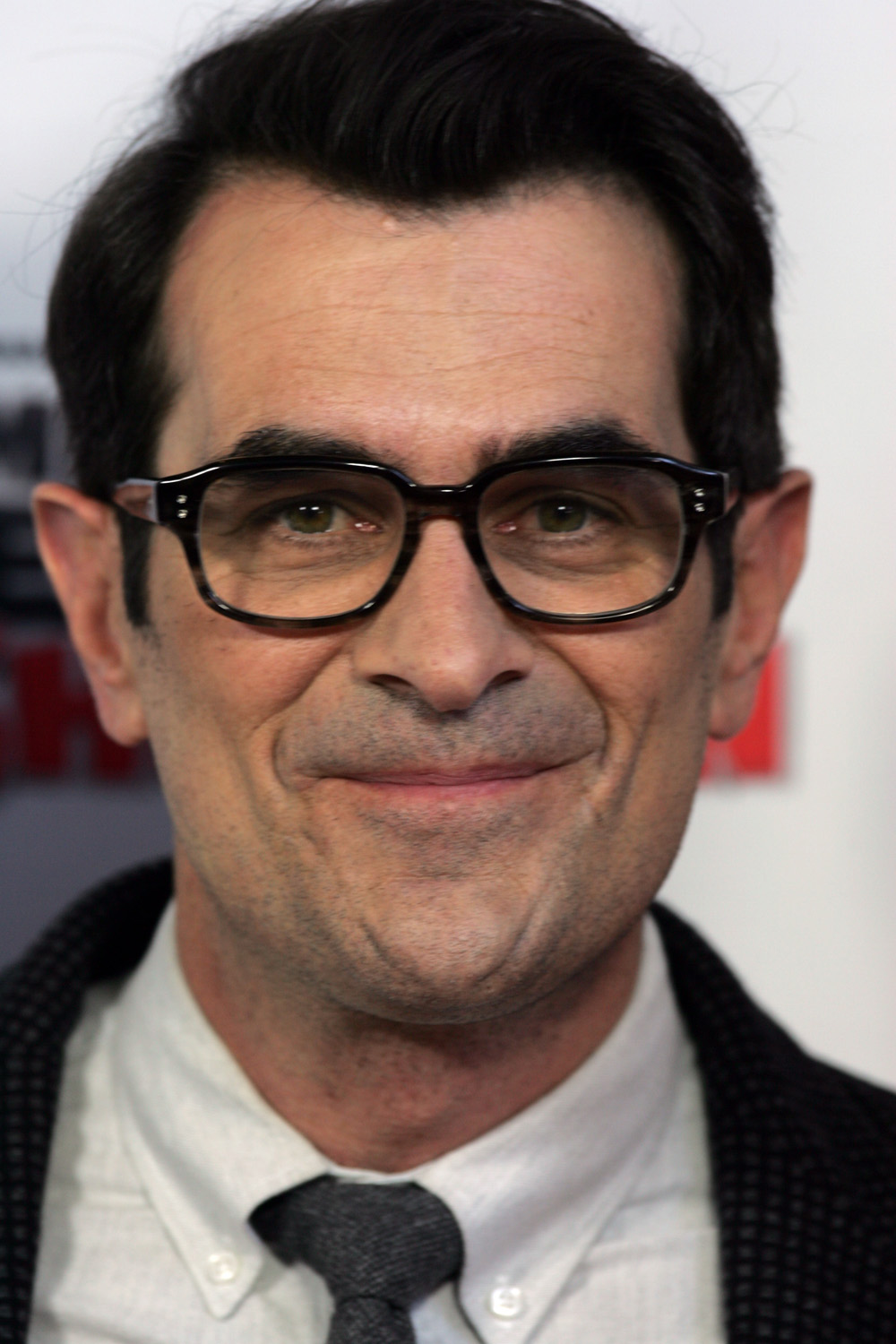
Ty Burrell's performance received praise from multiple critics.

"Bixby's Back" received mixed reviews from critics with many critics saying it didn't live up to its predecessor, "My Funky Valentine".

The A.V. Club writer John Teti gave the episode a mixed review calling it "fine". Teti wrote that he felt like the producers "was doing Valentine’s Day [episode] out of obligation" and that the writers did not have a "great idea" for this episode like "My Funky Valentine". He ultimately gave the episode a B−. Entertainment Weekly writer Lesley Savage gave the episode a more positive review saying the cast "proved why they truly deserved the award in tonight's Valentine's Day themed episode."

Rachael Maddux of New York magazine said the episode was a great sequel to "My Funky Valentine" calling it "a solid episode, start to finish".

Meredith Blake of the Los Angeles Times said the episode was below the show's usual quality writing that "it didn't quite have the usual zing". CNN writer Henry Hanks gave the episode a more positive review and praised Ty Burrell's performance calling him the "MVP of the week". He later went on to criticize Mitchell and Cameron's sub-plot calling it "another sub-par storyline".

Despite the mixed reviews, many praised Ty Burrell's performance. Teti praised both the writing and the acting in the bar scene writing that "There is a fantastic run of writing during Clive and Juliana’s rendezvous at the bar, as every smooth Clive Bixby utterance stumbles out of Phil’s mouth with just the right amount of awkwardness". Maddux called his performance "comedic mastery".
