= Mother Tucker =

Mother Tucker may refer to:

- Mother Tucker (Family Guy), an episode of the TV series Family Guy
- Mother Tucker (Modern Family), an episode of the TV series Modern Family
