= Caught in the Act (Modern Family) =

- Modern Family episode
- Luke (Nolan Gould), Haley (Sarah Hyland) and Alex (Ariel Winter), moments before catching their parents in the act.
- Episode no.: Season 2 Episode 13
- Directed by: Michael Spiller
- Written by: Steven Levitan; Jeffrey Richman
- Production code: 2ARG13
- Original air date: January 19, 2011

Guest appearance
- Rachael Harris as Amelia

Episode chronology
| ← Previous "Our Children, Ourselves" | Next → "Bixby's Back" |
- Modern Family season 2

"Caught in the Act" is the 13th episode of the second season of the American television comedy series, Modern Family and the 37th overall episode of the series. Co-creator Steven Levitan & Jeffrey Richman wrote the episode and Michael Spiller directed it. The episode originally aired on the American Broadcasting Company (ABC) in the United States on January 19, 2011. It featured guest star Rachael Harris as restaurant owner, Amelia.

In the episode, Gloria and Jay are about to go on vacation while Manny is away visiting his father, but their plans are interrupted when Gloria accidentally sends a rude email to Claire. When they go to the Dunphys' house to apologize or try to erase it, they find Claire and Phil in a state of dismay because their kids have just walked in on them having sex.

"Caught in the Act" received mixed reviews from critics. According to the Nielsen Media Research, "Caught in the Act" dropped four percent in the ratings from the last episode of the series to air in its regular timeslot and received a 4.6 rating/12% share in the 18-49 demographic. Despite this, the episode won the Primetime Emmy Award for Outstanding Writing for a Comedy Series.

Rico Rodriguez does not appear in the episode, due to his contract only calling for him to appear in 22 episodes of the season.

== Plot ==
The Dunphy children prepare a nice anniversary breakfast for their parents Phil (Ty Burrell) and Claire (Julie Bowen), but end up walking in on them having sex. Luke (Nolan Gould) is not quite sure what happened while Haley (Sarah Hyland) and Alex (Ariel Winter) are reeling with shock and horror because they know exactly what happened. Claire is much more upset about the kids seeing them than Phil is, largely due to her similar experience of walking in on Jay (Ed O'Neill) and her mother having sex when she was a child. While Claire and Phil hide out in their bedroom, the kids leave the house and talk about what happened over ice cream, with Luke noting that he would rather have parents who do that than parents who are divorced like many of his friends; they make a deal to sit poker-faced through Claire's subsequent address to them, which makes Claire happy — along with Phil stating that every anniversary with her makes him happy. In the end, the kids come up with an ideal anniversary present: a door lock for the bedroom door. However, the lock makes a loud ricochet sound when Phil and Claire use it, thus horrifying the Dunphy brood anew as an indicator of unseen parental sexual intercourse.

Jay and Gloria (Sofía Vergara) prepare for a vacation to Las Vegas (and a three-tower restaurant wine room). Before leaving, Jay pranks Gloria by pretending to write a diplomatic email to Claire regarding an upcoming school bake sale, but instead writing her brutally honest version as dictated; he then accidentally sends it, causing Gloria to panic. When they show up at the Dunphy's to try and retrieve the email, Claire thinks Gloria's references to the letter are actually references to the kids seeing the sex show. Gloria and Jay lie that the e-mail was a naked picture of Gloria. Claire then confronts Jay for burying her own accidental sight of him having sex with his wife, and Phil figures out what Gloria was really looking for. In the end, the email is deleted without further Claire-Gloria acrimony.

Mitchell (Jesse Tyler Ferguson) and Cameron (Eric Stonestreet) have been unhappy with dinner lately, as Cameron explains that Mitchell's long hours, the work involved in getting ready to go out with Lily, and their geographic location limits them to walking and that limits them to a nearby kebab joint. But good news beckons when they learn that the eponymous owner of the hot new eatery, Amelia's, is the mom of a little boy in Lily's preschool, and they set up a playdate with the ulterior motive of getting Amelia (Rachael Harris) to make them "in" at the restaurant. All goes well, and Amelia tells them they can get in if they say something that she does not specify because she has to take a phone call. Mitchell and Cameron accidentally hear the speaker phone feed and realize Amelia is an incredibly angry woman, and when they agree to watch her son Jackson while she goes to talk to the contractor who enraged her, they see that one of Lily's juice boxes was pierced and spilled red liquid over a $50,000 carpet. The guys ponder whether to move the entire carpet around to hide the stain but then they agree to blame Jackson when Amelia gets back by lying that he took one of the strawberry juice packs and drank some before spilling the rest. When Amelia hears it, Cameron and Mitchell learn that Jackson is allergic to strawberries and needs an immediate injection to prevent catastrophe, so they hold him down as Amelia prepares to inject him before finally admitting their ruse. With Amelia's forever lost to them, they end up glumly returning for more kabobs and indifferent customer service.

== Production ==
"Caught in the Act" was written by series co-creator Steven Levitan and co-producer Jeffrey Richman. The episode was directed by Michael Spiller. The episode was Levitan's sixth writing credit for the series. and Richman's second. It was aired on January 19, 2011 on the American Broadcasting Company. This episode of Modern Family was filmed on December 2, and December 3, 2010.

In August 2010, series co-creator and executive producer, Levitan revealed the Dunphy plot to TV Guide. Four months later, more details of the plot were revealed to TV Guide while filming the episode. The Dunphy plot was based on an incident when Levitan's daughter walked in on him and his wife having sex, which they kept quiet about for a long period of time. The Mitchell-Cameron plot was also based on a real-life incident. Co-writer Richman had "spilled wine on a friend's expensive rug then tried to turn the rug so that the stain was hidden under a piece of furniture". In an interview, Richman stated that:

"After having pitched the story from my life and finding out I had done something so unlikable, to have actual characters on television do that, I realized America wouldn't like them. That made me think twice about what to pitch next time."

== Reception ==
=== Ratings ===
In its original American broadcast, "Caught in the Act" was viewed by an estimated 10.94 million households and received a 4.6 rating/12% share among adults between the ages of 18 and 49 making it one of the few shows to not decline in the ratings against American Idol. Despite this, the episode dropped 4% from "Slow Down Your Neighbors" which was the last episode of the series to air in its regular timeslot. Added with the DVR viewers, the episode received a 6.3 rating in the 18-49 demographic, adding a 1.7 rating to the original viewership.

=== Reviews ===
The episode received mixed reviews from television critics.

TV Squad writer Joel Keller wrote of the episode that it was "the first real clunker the show's had this season". He criticized Gloria's plot writing that "misunderstanding should have been funnier. But for some reason, it didn't hit with me. Maybe because the situations seemed forced together, or maybe Jay taking the bullet for Gloria by saying the e-mail she was trying to delete was one of her naked [...] was too easy of an out for Gloria. But that plot just fell flat."

John Teti of The A.V. Club gave the episode a more positive review. He mainly liked the Pritchetts' and the Dunphys' storylines, but criticized Mitchell and Cameron's storyline saying "Look, Eric Stonestreet and Jesse Tyler Ferguson can make almost anything [...] enjoyable to watch, but their talents are wasted by running them through this same shtick again. They deserve better." He ultimately gave the episode a B.

Despite the lukewarm reviews, the episode won the Outstanding Writing for a Comedy Series at the 63rd Primetime Emmy Awards.
