= Modern Family season 2 =

Modern Family
- Season 2
- DVD cover
- Starring: Ed O'Neill; Sofía Vergara; Julie Bowen; Ty Burrell; Jesse Tyler Ferguson; Eric Stonestreet; Sarah Hyland; Ariel Winter; Nolan Gould; Rico Rodriguez
- No. of episodes: 24

Release
- Original network: ABC
- Original release: September 22, 2010 – May 25, 2011

Season chronology
- ← Previous; Season 1 Next → Season 3

The second season of the American television sitcom Modern Family aired on ABC from September 22, 2010 to May 25, 2011.

The season was produced by Lloyd-Levitan Productions in association with 20th Century Fox Television, with series creators Steven Levitan and Christopher Lloyd serving as showrunners. This season was ordered on January 12, 2010.

The season received positive reviews from most critics, with many naming it among the best seasons of 2010. Despite this, the season received criticism for a sophomore slump, most notably from Alan Sepinwall. Despite the criticism, the ratings for the series rose from the previous season due to the series winning a Primetime Emmy Award for Outstanding Comedy Series. The series became the highest rated scripted program in the 18-49 demographic and the twenty-fourth most viewed program among all viewers; it was tied for being the highest rated ABC program. The series has also been nominated and won several awards including a Screen Actors Guild Award for Outstanding Performance by an Ensemble in a Comedy Series and Primetime Emmy Award for Outstanding Comedy Series, the second year in a row.

== Production ==
=== Crew ===
The second season of the show was produced by Lloyd-Levitan Productions in association with 20th Century Fox Television and airs on the American Broadcasting Company (ABC). Modern Family is produced by co-creators Christopher Lloyd and Steven Levitan who serve as executive producers and show runners with Bill Wrubel as co-executive producer. Despite being produced by Lloyd-Levitan Productions, Steven Levitan and Christopher Lloyd dissolved their four-year business partnership. Returning writers from the first season included Paul Corrigan, Joe Lawson, Levitan, Lloyd, Dan O'Shannon, Brad Walsh, Ilana Wernick, Wrubel, and Danny Zuker. Joining the writing staff during the second season were Jerry Collins, Alex Herschlag, Abraham Higginbotham, Elaine Ko, Jeffrey Richman. Higginbotham had previously worked with Jesse Tyler Ferguson on the short lived Fox sitcom, Do Not Disturb. Returning directors are Michael Spiller and Chris Koch while new directors are Gail Mancuso, Scott Ellis and Beth McCarthy-Miller. Jason Winer, who directed 14 episodes of the first season didn't receive a credit for the season due to him directing his first film, Arthur.

=== Cast ===
Modern Family employs an ensemble cast. The series is set in Los Angeles and focuses on the family lives of Jay Pritchett (Ed O'Neill), his daughter Claire Dunphy (Julie Bowen), and his son Mitchell Pritchett (Jesse Tyler Ferguson). Claire is a homemaker mom married to Phil Dunphy (Ty Burrell); they have three children, Haley (Sarah Hyland), the typical teenager, Alex (Ariel Winter), the smart middle child, and Luke (Nolan Gould), the offbeat only son. Jay is married to a much younger Colombian woman, Gloria (Sofía Vergara), and is helping her raise her pre-teen son, Manny (Rico Rodriguez). Mitchell and his partner Cameron Tucker (Eric Stonestreet) have adopted a Vietnamese baby, Lily (twins Ella Hiller and Jaden Hiller). The child actors were only obligated to appear in 22 episodes.

Several notable actors made guest appearances throughout the second season of Modern Family. The season featured the return of Shelley Long as DeDe Pritchett who brought a new boyfriend, Claire's ex-boyfriend who was played by Matt Dillon. Another ex-partner that appeared on the show is Mitchell's ex-girlfriend who was played by Mary Lynn Rajskub in the twelfth episode. Celia Weston also made her first appearance as Cameron's mother, Barb Tucker in the ninth episode. Nathan Lane appeared as ultra-flamboyant "friend" of Mitchell & Cameron, Pepper Saltsman. In the episode, "Earthquake", it is revealed Pepper is Cameron's ex-boyfriend. Other guest appearances included Danny Trejo played a janitor at Manny and Luke's school who is feared by many students and adds tension to Claire's relationship with Gloria in the tenth episode. James Marsden played Mitchell and Cameron's new shirtless "neighbor" in the eleventh episode. Fred Willard was originally set to return this season, but didn't for unknown reasons.

=== Writing ===
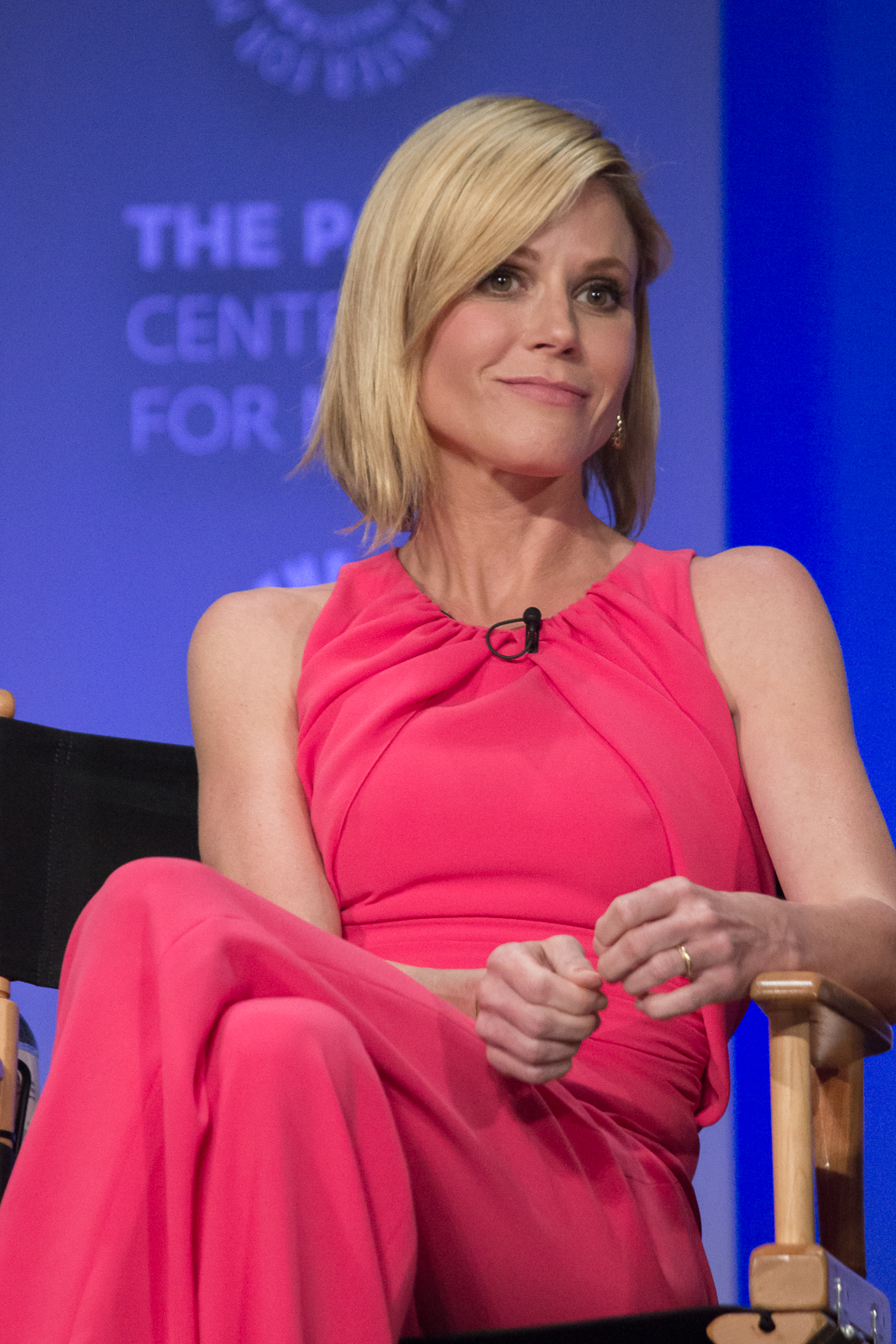
The second season saw the development of Julie Bowen's character Claire Dunphy.

Much like the first season, much of story lines featured in episodes were based on true events that happened to the writers. For example, Phil and Claire's storyline in "Manny Get Your Gun" was based on a personal experience of executive producer Steven Levitan's in which he and his wife would debate on which way was the fastest to go home from a restaurant. The first part of the season also saw the development of Claire Dunphy, most notably in "The Old Wagon", "Halloween" and "Dance Dance Revelation". The writers also sought to respond to criticism of leveled at the near the end of the first season for the lack of physical affection exhibited by Cameron and Mitchell to each other, which spawned a Facebook campaign demanding Mitchell and Cameron be allowed to kiss. In response to the controversy, producers released a statement that a season two episode would address Mitchell's discomfort with public displays of affection. Executive producer Levitan has said that it was unfortunate that the issue had arisen, since the show's writers had always planned on such a scene "as part of the natural development of the show." The response episode, "The Kiss" was eventually written and aired during the second season and drew praise from multiple critics for the subtle nature of the kiss and became the fourth highest rated episode of the series so far. During the second season, the writers stopped using a voice over at the end of most episodes which had been criticized by some critics during the first season for being "hokey".

== Episodes ==
No. overall	No. in season	Title	Directed by	Written by	Original release date	Prod. code	U.S. viewers (millions)
25	1	"The Old Wagon"	Michael Spiller	Bill Wrubel	September 22, 2010	2ARG05	12.67
Phil finally agrees to sell the old station wagon, but only after a family trip down the memory lane; Cameron asks Jay for help when Mitchell decides to build a life-size princess castle for Lily. Mitchell's resolve to prove his masculinity ends in chaos.
26	2	"The Kiss"	Scott Ellis	Abraham Higginbotham	September 29, 2010	2ARG04	11.92
After Claire finds flirty texts from a boy on Alex's phone, Claire tells Haley to give her advice, in which she tells Alex to kiss the boy, which makes her go up to the boy, and ask him in front of his friends, embarrassing him. Mitchell is having trouble kissing Cam in public, Phil works hard to fix Jay's printer, and Jay must cope with Gloria's customs.
27	3	"Earthquake"	Michael Spiller	Paul Corrigan & Brad Walsh	October 6, 2010	2ARG01	11.44
An earthquake shakes up the families, causing chaos and comical misadventures. Claire gets stuck in the bathroom with a plumber, while Phil scrambles to cover up the damage caused by a fallen shelf he had failed to secure properly. Meanwhile, Cameron and Mitchell use the earthquake as an excuse to avoid attending a friend's party, claiming Mitchell was injured and their house was damaged. Their plan backfires when the friend arrives to help, leading Cameron to awkwardly confess the truth, which only makes things worse. To calm the situation, Mitchell blurts out that Cameron still has unresolved feelings for the friend. At the same time, Jay refuses to go to church, insisting that God can be found in nature, which inspires Manny to skip church as well. Instead, Jay takes Manny golfing. Gloria is upset by their decision, but Manny later has a change of heart and chooses to go to church, leaving Jay to reflect on his stance.
28	4	"Strangers on a Treadmill"	Scott Ellis	Danny Zuker	October 13, 2010	2ARG02	11.45
Claire and Mitchell team up to save their significant others from potential embarrassment, but their plan doesn't go as smoothly as they hoped. Phil is set to host a Realtors' event and has written a speech filled with jokes that Claire finds painfully unfunny. However, she’s hesitant to tell him the truth since she’s always supported his belief that he's funny. Meanwhile, Mitchell faces a similar dilemma with Cameron, who has taken up cycling and insists on wearing overly tight and revealing shorts. Both siblings agree to break the news to each other's partners. Claire manages to confront Cameron, but her honesty leaves him in tears. Mitchell, on the other hand, chickens out and avoids telling Phil about his jokes. The truth eventually comes out when Cameron overhears Mitchell discussing the shorts with Claire on the phone, leaving Cameron upset. To make matters worse for Claire, she hides Phil’s speech right before the event, only for Phil to improvise a hilarious speech that leaves the audience in stitches—much to her surprise. Meanwhile, Haley attempts to teach Alex how to be "cool," leading to funny sisterly moments as Alex struggles to grasp her older sister’s social advice.
29	5	"Unplugged"	Michael Spiller	Steven Levitan	October 20, 2010	2ARG06	11.97
Phil, Claire, and the kids try to improve their communication skills by giving up their electronic devices. Gloria is getting obsessed over a neighbor's barking dog, and Mitchell and Cameron try to find a preschool for Lily.
30	6	"Halloween"	Michael Spiller	Jeffrey Richman	October 27, 2010	2ARG09	13.14
Claire loves Halloween and is gearing up to spookify the Dunphy house for the trick or treaters. Phil gets worried about his relationship after hearing about a neighbour's divorce. She gives each family member a role to play, but none of it goes quite right... Cameron can't shake a traumatic childhood experience and hates the holiday, Mitchell has had a terrible day at work as he shows up in a Spider-Man costume, and Gloria starts acting weird after Jay and Manny tease her about her accent.
31	7	"Chirp"	Michael Spiller	Dan O'Shannon	November 3, 2010	2ARG03	12.24
Claire & Haley are at home sick while Phil tries to find an annoying chirping smoke detector. The talk between them about a soap opera character leads to a miscommunication. Gloria and Manny go to Jay's work place, much to Jay's dismay and an ordeal with an employee leads to an argument between Jay and Manny. Cameron takes Lily to a commercial shoot against Mitchell's wishes, which doesn't go as per his plans. Note: Ariel Winter did not appear in this episode.
32	8	"Manny Get Your Gun"	Michael Spiller	Story by : Christopher Lloyd; Teleplay by : Danny Zuker	November 17, 2010	2ARG11	12.09
Everyone gathers at a restaurant for Manny's birthday when Manny has a mini-life crisis of getting older, Phil and Claire have a race to see who can get there faster, and Mitchell and Cam get stuck at the mall looking for a gift.
33	9	"Mother Tucker"	Michael Spiller	Paul Corrigan & Brad Walsh	November 24, 2010	2ARG07	10.57
Mitchell tries to tell Cameron how he feels uncomfortable with his mom, Barbra Tucker. Meanwhile, Haley breaks up with Dylan much to Phil's dismay. Jay has a little stomach ache gets exacerbated when he and Manny look it up on the internet. Note: Nolan Gould did not appear in this episode.
34	10	"Dance Dance Revelation"	Gail Mancuso	Ilana Wernick	December 8, 2010	2ARG08	11.08
At Luke and Manny's first school dance, Jay and Phil take them to the mall which turns disastrous, Claire's happiness turns into jealousy when Gloria joins the school dance committee. Meanwhile, Cameron and Mitchell learn about Lily biting other kids at the playground. Note: Sarah Hyland and Ariel Winter did not appear in this episode.
35	11	"Slow Down Your Neighbors"	Gail Mancuso	Ilana Wernick	January 5, 2011	2ARG12	11.83
Claire becomes a determined neighborhood vigilante hoping to catch and stop a car that speeds through their streets. Meanwhile, Phil is busy trying to land an important listing with a difficult client, Jay teaches Manny and Gloria how to ride a bike, and Mitchell and Cameron meet a charming mysterious neighbor. Note: Ariel Winter did not appear in this episode.
36	12	"Our Children, Ourselves"	Adam Shankman	Dan O'Shannon & Bill Wrubel	January 12, 2011	2ARG10	11.12
Alex's dedication to learning makes Phil & Claire question themselves. Gloria tries to meet new friends. Mitchell runs into an ex-girlfriend while out with Cameron. Note: Sarah Hyland did not appear in this episode.
37	13	"Caught in the Act"	Michael Spiller	Steven Levitan & Jeffrey Richman	January 19, 2011	2ARG13	10.94
While Manny is away visiting his father, Gloria and Jay are about to go on vacation, but their plans are interrupted when they accidentally send an insulting email to Claire. When they go to the Dunphys' house to apologize, they find Claire and Phil in a state of dismay because their kids have just walked in on them having sex. Mitchell and Cameron have trouble getting reservations at a popular new restaurant, so they try to ingratiate themselves with the restaurant's owner, whose son is a schoolmate of Lily's, but it does not go according to plan. Note: Rico Rodriguez did not appear in this episode.
38	14	"Bixby's Back"	Chris Koch	Danny Zuker	February 9, 2011	2ARG16	13.16
Claire and Phil decide to reprise their role-playing adventure from the previous year, only for something to go wrong in the hotel; Jay's elaborate Valentine's surprise for Gloria keeps getting held up; an admirer comes between Cameron and Mitchell.
39	15	"Princess Party"	Michael Spiller	Elaine Ko	February 16, 2011	2ARG17	10.57
The guest list for Lily's princess-themed birthday party gets a little out of hand when Mitchell decides to invite his mom, much to Claire's dismay, and disinvite Fizbo, much to Cameron's dismay. Things get even more strange when DeDe (Shelley Long) shows up with Claire's old high school boyfriend (Matt Dillon) in tow, and Jay and Gloria each turn to their own unique methods of dealing with having to see Dede.
40	16	"Regrets Only"	Dean Parisot	Abraham Higginbotham	February 23, 2011	2ARG14	10.17
Phil and Claire had a huge fight and Phil hasn't a clue as to what it was about, so Gloria steps in to counsel Phil and Jay takes Claire out. Meanwhile, Jay may have some regret in buying Gloria a karaoke machine, and Cameron is in full prep mode for a huge fundraising event and enlists help from Mitchell and Luke -- which might not be the best choices.
41	17	"Two Monkeys and a Panda"	Beth McCarthy-Miller	Carol Leifer	March 2, 2011	2ARG15	10.11
While Claire runs herself ragged trying to play peacemaker with Haley and Alex, Phil sneaks off for a nice relaxing day at the spa. Meanwhile, Gloria is horrified by Jay's morbid plans to purchase two primo side-by-side crypts in preparation of the inevitable future, and Cameron decides he wants to write a book that celebrates the fact that Lily is adopted -- however, during the process he unearths artifacts that are quite disturbing. Note: Nolan Gould did not appear in this episode.
42	18	"Boys' Night"	Chris Koch	Steven Levitan & Jeffrey Richman	March 23, 2011	2ARG20	10.90
Phil and Claire are fearful when they find out that Luke has befriended their old neighbor, Mr. Kleezak, but they try not to be judgemental. Jay tries to avoid sitting through a symphony concert with Gloria and Manny, and ends up in a bar where Mitchell and Cameron are having a "boys' night out" with their gay friends, while Haley is babysitting Lily. Mitchell is surprised to see a different side of Jay.
43	19	"The Musical Man"	Michael Spiller	Paul Corrigan & Brad Walsh	April 13, 2011	2ARG19	9.61
Cameron takes control of the spring musical at Luke and Manny's school, while Jay's brother pays him a visit with a shocking secret, and Phil tries to get the family to be in his new real estate advertisement, though it does not turn out the way it should have.
44	20	"Someone to Watch Over Lily"	Michael Spiller	Bill Wrubel	April 20, 2011	2ARG18	9.95
Mitchell and Cameron are looking to assign legal guardians for Lily in case anything were to happen to them, and are secretly assessing their family members. But no one is blowing their socks off, as they witness Jay giving Manny a dose of tough love, Claire secretly taking Luke to a child psychologist to assess his development, and Haley and Alex getting into some delinquent activities at school.
45	21	"Mother's Day"	Michael Spiller	Dan O'Shannon & Ilana Wernick	May 4, 2011	2ARG21	9.90
Claire and Gloria's Mother's Day excursion outdoors with the kids turns into the mother of all disasters. Meanwhile, Phil and Jay share an awkward moment after Jay finds a letter he wrote to his mom on a past Mother's Day when they stay home to prepare dinner for everyone; and Mitchell attempts to show his appreciation for Cameron by bringing him breakfast in bed on Mother's Day; causing Cameron to worry about the gender roles in his relationship with Mitchell.
46	22	"Good Cop Bad Dog"	Fred Savage	Story by : Abraham Higginbotham; Teleplay by : Abraham Higginbotham & Jeffrey Richman	May 11, 2011	2ARG22	10.15
Jay advises a dog trainer for a business endeavour, while Phil and Claire switch parenting duties of being the strict one and the cool one, much to the kids' chagrin. Mitchell has a dilemma regarding going to a Lady Gaga concert when Cameron ends up sick.
47	23	"See You Next Fall"	Steven Levitan	Danny Zuker	May 18, 2011	2ARG24	10.30
The whole family gathers at Jay's house before heading out to Alex's graduation ceremony from middle school, but while at the house, Jay is preoccupied hiding a botox mishap from everyone, Cameron is upset about Mitchell's habit of laughing at him, and Phil tries to sympathize with, yet also criticizes Claire on her impending breakdown over the kids growing up too fast. The family gets held back when the garage door won't open, and Phil and Claire try to get there in an unconventional way.
48	24	"The One That Got Away"	James Bagdonas	Paul Corrigan & Brad Walsh & Dan O'Shannon	May 25, 2011	2ARG23	10.31
Jay wants to go fishing on his birthday, but the family insists he has a big party, leading Claire and Mitchell to get trapped in their childhood yard, Phil to encounter his college nemesis at the mall and Cameron to have trouble at the bakery when people overhear a phone call he has with Manny when he gives him advice on how to talk to a girl who's in 6th grade leading people to think Cam is something he's not and he gets kicked out of the bakery. Jay ends up having quite a different day than originally planned.

== Reception ==
=== Reviews ===
'Modern Family's' outstanding cast continues to impress, and even wobbly episodes reliably supply sharp observations and goofball charm.

— Maureen Ryan, TV Squad

The second season reached positive reviews much like the previous season. Maureen Ryan of TV Squad named the season along with Cougar Town and Better Off Ted one of the best shows of 2010. Robert Bianco of USA Today gave the new season four stars out of four saying "Not since Frasier has a sitcom offered such an ideal blend of heart and smarts, or proven itself so effortlessly adept at so many comic variations, from subtle wordplay to big-laugh slapstick to everything in between." Robert Bianco in a later review stated "as good as it was in its first year, is even better in its second" positively comparing the characters to the characters from The Mary Tyler Moore Show, The Cosby Show and Friends. TV Squad writer Joel Keller praised the show's avoidance of the sophomore slump writing "Steve Levitan, Christopher Lloyd, and their cast and crew haven't missed a beat, churning out consistently funny episodes as if its wildly-successful first season never ended.".

"Manny Get Your Gun" received overwhelmingly positive reviews from critics with many of them comparing it to the quality of the first-season episodes, with TV Guide writer Matt Roush calling it "comedy gold". The episode was later put in for Primetime Emmy Award for Outstanding Comedy Series along with "The Old Wagon", "The Kiss", "Caught in the Act", "Someone to Watch Over Lily" and "Mother's Day". "Halloween" also received similar reviews, with The A.V. Club reviewer Donna Bowman comparing it to the critically acclaimed first-season episode, "Fizbo". The episode was also named the eleventh best episode of 2010 by TV Guide and was also named among the best 2010 episodes of Modern Family by The A.V. Club.

The second season of Modern Family has veered erratically from all-time classics, that deserve to stand with the best episodes from season one, to deeply mediocre or even bad episodes, almost without rhyme or reason. The show is still capable of greatness (and should have a solid set of Emmy tapes to submit, when the time comes), but it's distressingly free of the kinds of B/B+ episodes that let you know you're in good hands.

— Emily VanDerWerff, The A.V. Club

The episode, "Unplugged" received some controversy due to Gloria's line "Ah, here we go. Because, in Colombia, we trip over goats and we kill people in the street. Do you know how offensive that is? Like we're Peruvians!" Milagros Lizarraga, founder of the online group Peru USA Southern Ca, told the Associated Press, "It's incredible that in a country where everything is politically correct, ABC would have a line of this sort." Sofía Vergara responded to a fan asking about the script (in Spanish) "get a life".

The second season also received criticism for a "drop in quality". New York writer Rachel Muddux while reviewing "Chirp" wrote that "Modern Family feels like it's still struggling a little to live up to the Emmy-winning highs of its first, negotiating the boundaries of its family-sitcom roots and attempting to transcend cheap laughs." She later went on to say in a later review that "after three spot-on episodes in a row and nearly a month of reruns, the show kicked off its second season's second half in such fine form that we're hoping next week we won't feel at all compelled to mention how iffy things were looking there for a while.". Emily VanDerWerff of The A.V. Club while reviewing "Two Monkeys and a Panda", criticized the second season, saying that it has possibly tarnished the show's legacy as a "classic". HitFix reviewer Alan Sepinwall, who was very critical over the quality drop of the second season, received harsh comments from readers whenever he criticized an episode leading to him reviewing the series less frequently.

Eric Stonestreet's character Cameron Tucker, who was considered the best character of the first season, was mainly criticized. Sepinwall, while reviewing "The One That Got Away", wrote that Cameron had become a "whiny, overly-sensitive diva". TV Squad writer Joel Keller, while reviewing "Manny Get Your Gun", wrote that "It's just that sometimes Cam is too much Cam for his, or the audience's, own good". Despite the criticism, Ty Burrell went on to still receive praise from critics and fans alike. While the episode "Bixby's Back" received mixed reviews from critics, Burrell's performance was well received with Rachel Maddux of New York calling it "comedic mastery". Joyce Eng of TV Guide named Julie Bowen, Ed O'Neill and Nolan Gould among her dream ballot for Best Supporting Actor/Actress in a Comedy Series at the Emmy's. In a poll voted by TVLine readers, Vergara, was voted the most deserving of the Supporting Actress Award.

=== Awards and nominations ===
During its second season, Modern Family received two nominations at the 2010 Writers Guild of America Awards. Paul Corrigan and Brad Walsh were nominated for an Episodic Comedy for writing the episode, "Earthquake", but lost to Robert Carlock for his work on 30 Rock's "When It Rains, It Pours". The series also won Comedy Series. Modern Family garnered three nominations at the 2010 Satellite Awards for Best Television Series - Musical or Comedy. The series was also nominated for acting for Burrell and Bowen. The series went on to lose all three nominations. The series also received another Best Television Series - Musical or Comedy nomination at the 68th Golden Globe Awards for the second season in a row. The series also received a nomination for two supporting actor awards for Stonestreet and Vergara. Vergara received another acting nomination at the 17th Screen Actors Guild Awards, as did Burrell and O'Neill with the cast winning Ensemble in a Comedy. The series also won Best Comedy Series at the 2010 Producers Guild of America Awards, and tied with Glee for the Outstanding Comedy Series accolade at the 22nd GLAAD Media Awards. Michael Spiller also received a Directors Guild of America Award for Comedy Series at the 2010 ceremony, the series second win in the category. During the second season, Adweek named the show one of the 100 Most Influential TV Shows (98th chronologically).

At the inaugural Comedy Awards, the season received awards for Best Comedy Series and Comedy Directing - TV. The series was also nominated for Comedy Writing - TV and Ty Burrell for Comedy Actor - TV. In June 2011, Modern Family was nominated for six of the inaugural Critics' Choice Television Awards. The show itself was nominated for "Best Comedy Series" while Burrell, O'Neill, and Stonestreet were nominated for "Best Supporting Actor in a Comedy Series" while Bowen and Vergara are nominated for "Best Supporting Actress in a Comedy Series". The series won while Burrell, O'Neill and Stonestreet lost their nominated to Neil Patrick Harris of How I Met Your Mother while Bowen and Vergara lost to Busy Philipps of Cougar Town. Burrell received another acting nomination for Individual Achievement in Comedy at the TCA Awards his second nomination for the award and his first time winning. The series also received a TCA Award for Outstanding Achievement in Comedy, the second win for the series in a row.

The series also received 17 Emmy nominations including Outstanding Comedy Series, Outstanding Supporting Actor in a Comedy Series and Supporting Actress in a Comedy Series. The series received the third-most number of nominations for the year behind Mad Men and Boardwalk Empire. It later won five Emmys for Outstanding Comedy Series, Supporting Actor, Supporting Actress, Writing for a Comedy Series and Directing for a Comedy Series, all of which except for the latter were for the second win in a row. The season was also included on multiple top ten lists for best series of 2010 including: 1st on MSNBC's Top 10 TV shows of 2010, 2nd on Pastes 20 Best TV Shows of 2010, 2nd on Matt Roush's Top 10 TV, 4th on Metacritic's 2010 Television Critic Top Ten Lists, 8th Best TV Series of 2010, 13th on The A.V. Club's 25 best television series of 2010, American Film Institute's Top TV Shows of 2010, and Maureen Ryan's The Best TV of 2010: Top 10 Roster.

== Ratings ==
Like the previous season, Modern Family aired Wednesday at 9:00pm and is coupled with Cougar Town. Aided by winning the Primetime Emmy Award for Outstanding Comedy Series the show's second season became the highest rated show on Wednesday on premiere week and also rose 34% from the previous season among adults between the ages of 18 and 49. "The Old Wagon", the season premiere, finished 5th in the rating with a 5.1 rating among adults between the ages of 18 and 49. "Halloween", which was broadcast on October 27, was the highest rated episode of the season, finishing second with a 5.1 among adults between the ages of 18 and 49. "Bixby's Back" later tied with "Halloween" and "The Old Wagon" and finished fourth in the weekly ratings. The lowest rated episode of the season was "Mother Tucker", which was viewed by an estimated 10.53 million households with a 3.7 rating/12% share among 18- to 49-year-olds, which much like "Fizbo", might have received a drop due to airing on Thanksgiving Eve. The success of the series has led to the series being used as a "launch pad" to three ABC series, Cougar Town (which premiered the same season as MF), Mr. Sunshine and Happy Endings, with Mr. Sunshine being the only one not to be renewed. The second season ranked 24th among overall viewers and fifth among viewers between the ages of 18 and 49. The season averaged 11.76 million viewers in the seasonal 18–49 demographic ratings with an average of 4.8 rating/12% share in the demographic meaning that the season was watched by an average of 4.8% of households and 12% average of all televisions were tuned to the season when it was broadcast. Added with Digital video recorder viewers, the season received a 6.2 rating in the 18-49 demographic, adding a 1.7 rating to the original viewership beating its closest competition, Glee, by six-tenths of a point.

Viewership and ratings per episode of Modern Family season 2
No.	Title	Air date	Rating/share (18–49)	Viewers (millions)	DVR (18–49)	DVR viewers (millions)	Total (18–49)	Total viewers (millions)
1	"The Old Wagon"	September 22, 2010	5.1	12.67	1.3	2.77	6.4	15.47
2	"The Kiss"	September 29, 2010	4.6	11.92	1.5	3.02	6.1	14.95
3	"Earthquake"	October 6, 2010	4.6	11.44	1.5	2.94	6.1	14.41
4	"Strangers on a Treadmill"	October 13, 2010	4.8	11.45	1.4	2.9	6.2	14.38
5	"Unplugged"	October 20, 2010	4.8	11.97	1.4	2.89	6.2	14.92
6	"Halloween"	October 27, 2010	5.1	13.14	1.5	3.09	6.6	16.29
7	"Chirp"	November 3, 2010	4.8	12.24	1.3	2.94	6.1	15.2
8	"Manny Get Your Gun"	November 17, 2010	4.8	12.09	1.5	3.14	6.3	15.25
9	"Mother Tucker"	November 24, 2010	4.8	10.57	—N/a	—N/a	—N/a	—N/a
10	"Dance Dance Revelation"	December 8, 2010	4.2	11.08	—N/a	—N/a	—N/a	—N/a
11	"Slow Down Your Neighbors"	January 5, 2011	4.8	11.83	1.7	3.36	6.5	15.22
12	"Our Children, Ourselves"	January 12, 2011	4.2	11.12	1	2.06	5.2	11.14
13	"Caught in the Act"	January 19, 2011	4.6	10.94	—N/a	—N/a	—N/a	—N/a
14	"Bixby's Back"	February 9, 2011	5.1	13.16	1.7	3.3	6.8	16.47
15	"Princess Party"	February 16, 2011	4.3	10.57	1.9	3.76	6.2	14.34
16	"Regrets Only"	February 23, 2011	4.1	10.17	2.1	4.05	6.2	14.26
17	"Two Monkeys and a Panda"	March 2, 2011	4.1	10.11	—N/a	—N/a	—N/a	—N/a
18	"Boys' Night"	March 23, 2011	4.4	10.9	1.8	3.54	6.2	14.49
19	"The Musical Man"	April 13, 2011	3.9	9.61	—N/a	—N/a	—N/a	—N/a
20	"Someone to Watch Over Lily"	April 20, 2011	3.8	9.95	—N/a	—N/a	—N/a	—N/a
21	"Mother's Day"	May 4, 2011	3.9	9.9	2.2	4.14	6.1	14.04
22	"Good Cop Bad Dog"	May 11, 2011	4.3	10.15	2.2	4.45	6.5	14.6
23	"See You Next Fall"	May 18, 2011	4.1	10.3	2.1	4.31	6.2	14.62
24	"The One That Got Away"	May 25, 2011	4.2	10.31	—N/a	—N/a	—N/a	—N/a

== Home video release ==
The second season of Modern Family was released on DVD and Blu-ray in a three-disc set on September 20, 2011. The box-set contains all 24 episodes and include Deleted Family Interviews, Deleted and Extended Scenes, an episode's table read, a music video, a Blooper Reel and more.

Modern Family: The Complete Second Season
Set Details		Special Features
24 episodes; 3-disc set; 1.78:1 aspect ratio; English (Dolby Digital 5.1) (DVD); English (DTS-HD Master Audio 5.1) (Blu-ray); Subtitles: English, French and Spanish; Runtime: 514 minutes		Deleted, Extended & Alternate Scenes; Deleted Family Interviews; "Strangers on a Treadmill" Table Read; Mitch's Flash Mob; "Imagine Me Naked" Music Video; Gag Reel; Modern Family Holidays; Waiting for Oprah; Chatting with Steve Levitan; At Home with Modern Family
Release Dates
Region 1	Region 2	Region 4
September 20, 2011	September 5, 2011	September 14, 2011
