= Slow Down Your Neighbors =

- Modern Family episode
- Claire (Julie Bowen) holding the sign she made to make the speeding car driver slow down
- Episode no.: Season 2 Episode 11
- Directed by: Gail Mancuso
- Written by: Ilana Wernick
- Production code: 2ARG12
- Original air date: January 5, 2011

Guest appearances
- James Marsden as Barry; Jami Gertz as Laura

Episode chronology
← Previous "Dance Dance Revelation"	Next → "Our Children, Ourselves"
- Modern Family season 2

"Slow Down Your Neighbors" is the 11th episode of the second season of Modern Family and the 35th episode overall. It originally aired on January 5, 2011 on the American Broadcasting Company (ABC). The episode was written by Ilana Wernick and was directed by Gail Mancuso, who were also both credited for the previous episode, "Dance Dance Revelation". The episode features a guest appearance from James Marsden as Barry, Cameron and Mitchell's new neighbor.

In the episode, Claire becomes a neighborhood vigilante hoping to catch and stop a car that speeds through their streets. Meanwhile, Phil is busy trying to land an important listing with a difficult client, Jay struggles to teach Gloria and Manny how to ride a bike, Manny is surprisingly great at it and yet Gloria continues to try, and Mitchell and Cameron meet a charming mysterious neighbor.

"Slow Down Your Neighbors" received mostly positive reviews from critics, many of whom praised the performance of Nolan Gould. The episode was viewed by 11.756 million households and received a 4.8 rating/13% share among adults between the ages of 18 and 49 marking a 14% rise from the previous episode, "Dance Dance Revelation". The episode was the second highest-rated scripted program of the week behind The Simpsons which had received abnormally high ratings due to the NFL playoffs.

The episode was one of the three episodes of Modern Family that received nominations for Outstanding Directing for a Comedy Series at the 63rd Primetime Emmy Awards with Gail Mancuso as the nominee, along with "See You Next Fall" by Steven Levitan, but lost to Michael Spiller for directing "Halloween".

Ariel Winter does not appear in the episode.

== Plot ==
Recreation of Claire's sign

Claire (Julie Bowen) becomes a determined neighborhood vigilante hoping to catch and stop a sports car that is speeding through the suburban streets while Phil (Ty Burrell) sells a house nearby for a difficult client, Laura (Jami Gertz), who happens to be the driver of the car.

Claire prints out several posters, intending to say "slow down," with the license plate of the car below, and signed "your neighbors" below the license plate. However, the rest of her family point out that as presented, the posters actually state "slow down your neighbors." Regardless, Claire orders Phil to put them up. Later, Claire chases the car on a bicycle, but loses track of the car. She meets Phil at the open house he has arranged for Laura and is introduced to her. Laura is just about to leave and offers Claire a lift back to her home, she enters the car, realizing too late that Laura is the driver she despises, while Laura criticizes the posters' creator as a sex-starved woman without knowing that Claire had created the posters.

Manny (Rico Rodriguez) is about to ride his first bicycle to school. However, his stepfather Jay (Ed O'Neill) finds training wheels on the bike, set up by Manny's mother, Gloria (Sofía Vergara). Jay decides to teach Manny to ride without the stabilizers, and comes to realize Manny is a natural at riding a bike by himself. As Gloria has never ridden a bike either, after being traumatized by her mother that riding a bicycle is the best way to getting kidnapped, Jay tries to teach her, but she is unsuccessful.

Gloria turns to Phil for bike riding lessons but he is about to leave for the open house at Laura's. Luke (Nolan Gould) decides to teach her by squirting her with a water gun, and Gloria manages to ride it, but soon fails after Claire steals her bike while Gloria is still on it. Seeing as this teaching method is a success, Luke does the same to his big sister Haley (Sarah Hyland) to get her to study, with Phil's consent.

Mitchell (Jesse Tyler Ferguson) and Cameron (Eric Stonestreet) find out that they have a charming new neighbor named Barry (James Marsden) who has moved to the apartment above. Cameron takes an immediate liking to Barry, though Mitchell is reluctant because Barry is fond of reiki, which he considers as a bunch of hot air. However, as Mitchell starts to trust him, Cameron hears from his landlady (Sharon Omi) that nobody has moved into the apartment above and Cameron realizes Barry is living in his daughter's princess castle. When Cameron tells Barry to leave, he and Barry get into a physical struggle inside the castle; Cameron gets Mitchell to call the police but not after affirming that he was right in writing Barry off.

== Production ==
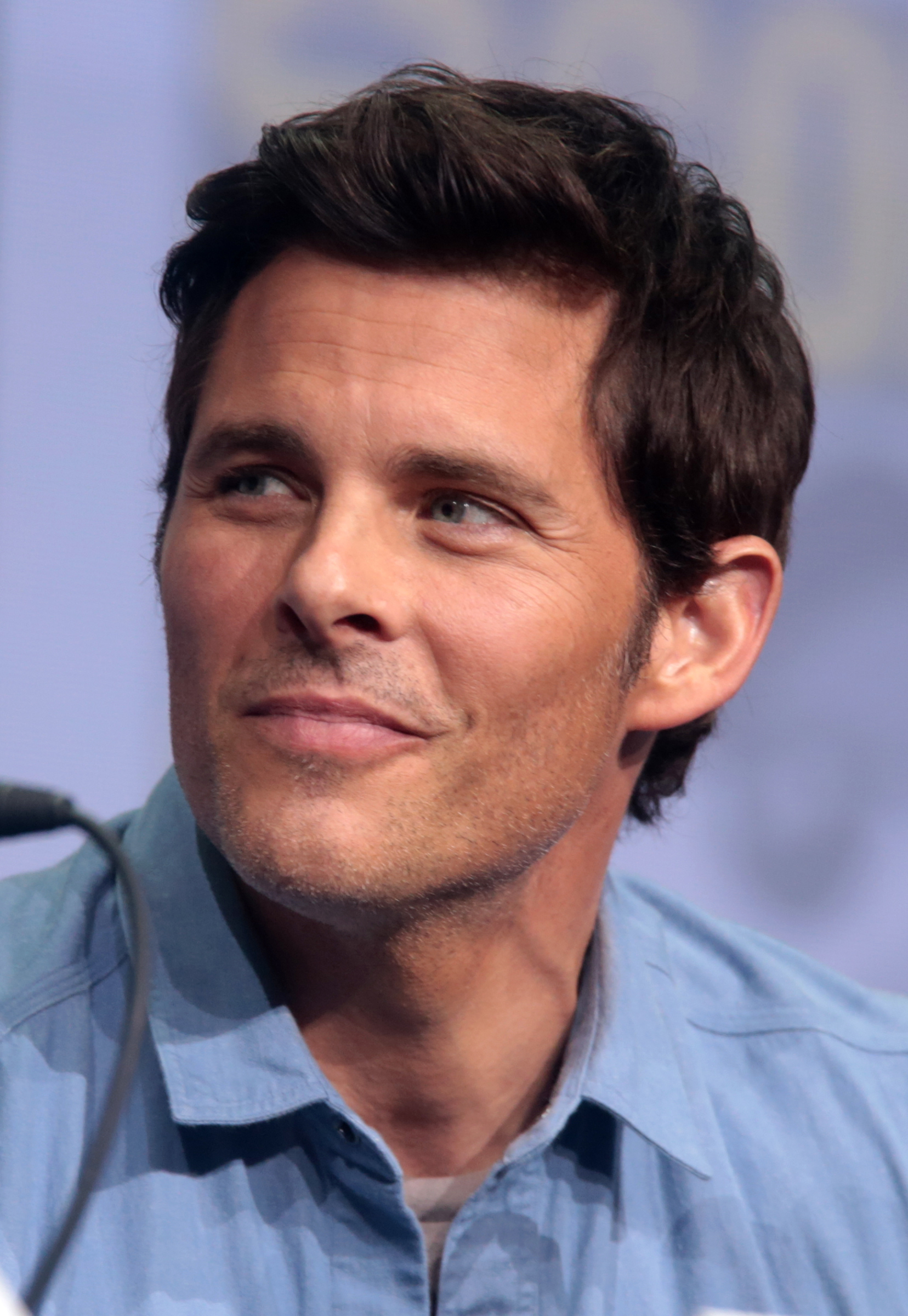
James Marsden (pictured in 2017) guest starred as Mitchell and Cameron's new neighbor

"Slow Down Your Neighbors" was written by Ilana Wernick and directed by Gail Mancuso. The episode is the third writing credit for Ilana Wernick after the first season finale, "Family Portrait" and the previously aired episode, "Dance Dance Revelation". The episode is also the second directing credit for Gail Mancuso after the previous episode, "Dance Dance Revelation".

"Slow Down Your Neighbors" originally aired on January 5, 2011 on American Broadcasting Company (ABC). The episode was filmed on October 27, and October 29, 2010.

In October 2010, William Keck of TV Guide reported that James Marsden would guest star on Modern Family as Cameron and Mitchell's new shirtless neighbor. Marsden filmed his appearance on October 29, 2010 which he described as a great experience saying they have "Really great comedians and writers on the show and it was great to have that behind you". The episode also featured a guest appearance from Jami Gertz, who played Laura, who was Phil's new client as well as the speedy driver.

== Reception ==
=== Ratings ===
In its original American broadcast on January 5, 2011, "Slow Down Your Neighbors" was viewed by an estimated 11.756 million viewers and received a 4.8 rating/13% share among adults between the ages of 18 and 49. This means that it was seen by 4.8% of all 18- to 49-year-olds, and 13% of all 18- to 49-year-olds watching television at the time of the broadcast. This marked a 14 percent rise in the 18–49 demographic from the previous original episode, "Dance Dance Revelation". The episode became the highest-rated show on ABC and finished 6th in the ratings for the week of January 3 to January 9, 2010. The episode also became the second highest-rated scripted show after the episode of The Simpsons "Moms I'd Like to Forget" which had followed the highly rated NFL play-offs. Added with DVR viewers, "Slow Down Your Neighbors" received a 6.5 rating in the 18–49 demographic, adding a 1.7 to the original viewership.

=== Reviews ===
The episode received mostly positive reviews from critics.

Donna Bowman of The A.V. Club praised "Slow Down Your Neighbors" for the use of all the characters, writing "Attention to detail may be one of the factors that makes Modern Family such a solid sitcom specimen." She ultimately rated the episode with an A−.

TV Squad writer Joel Keller was positive, but noted the episode "felt a little slapstick and predictable". Despite this he said "some pretty funny moments crossing our screens."

Lesley Savage of Entertainment Weekly complemented James Marsden's performance, naming it the second-best moment of the episode and commented that the scene of his character and Cameron fighting in the Lily's princess castle "the best moment of the entire show". New York writer Rachael Maddux commented that "the show kicked off its second season's second half in such fine form". Kara Klenc of TV Guide called the episode "great".

Sam Morgan of Hollywood complimented the writers for adding a "twist on a traditional sitcom story" for the Mitchell-Cameron storyline. Morgan also praised the performance of Ty Burrell saying that it "showed that Ty Burrell deserved the Emmy over Eric Stonestreet".

Not all reviews were positive. HitFix reviewer Alan Sepinwall wrote that the episode "didn't really work for me" due to the Claire-Phil storyline although he did compliment Marsden's performance.

Multiple critics praised the performance of Nolan Gould. Time contributor James Poniewozik wrote it was a "great episode for his character all around" and called him "the topper in this episode". Joel Keller called Gould's character Luke, "one of the funniest dumb kids ever created for television". He also praised the scene featuring Luke spraying Gloria with a water gun and then later drinking from it saying that "it reminded us that this new hard-ass is still Luke at the end of the day".
