= The Kiss (Modern Family) =

- Modern Family episode
- The moment after Mitchell (Jesse Tyler Ferguson) avoids Cameron's (Eric Stonestreet) kiss
- Episode no.: Season 2 Episode 2
- Directed by: Scott Ellis
- Written by: Abraham Higginbotham
- Production code: 2ARG04
- Original air date: September 29, 2010

Episode chronology
← Previous "The Old Wagon"	Next → "Earthquake"
- Modern Family season 2

"The Kiss" is the second episode of the second season of the American sitcom Modern Family and the 26th episode overall. The episode aired September 29, 2010. It was written by Abraham Higginbotham and directed by Scott Ellis. The episode also featured guest star Aaron Sanders as Jeremy, Alex's love interest. The episode serves as a response to a criticism for the first season that Mitchell and Cameron never kissed.

In the episode, after Claire finds flirty texts from a boy on Alex's phone, she asks Haley to give her advice. Haley tells Alex to kiss the boy, which makes her go up to the boy, and asks him in front of his friends, embarrassing him. Mitchell is having trouble kissing Cam in public and Gloria makes a meal of traditional Colombian food to honor her recently deceased grandmother.

"The Kiss" received generally positive reviews with many praising the subtle nature of the kiss. According to the Nielsen Media Research the episode received a 4.6 rating/13% share in the 18–49 demographic, going down from the season premiere, but still becoming the highest-rated show on Wednesday and the second highest-rated scripted program after Glee.

== Plot ==
At the Dunphy house, Claire (Julie Bowen) "accidentally" reads Alex's text messages to a boy named Jeremy and asks Haley (Sarah Hyland) to talk to Alex (Ariel Winter) about them, while Phil (Ty Burrell) helps Jay with his printer. Haley gives bad advice to Alex, saying if she does not kiss the boy that people will think she is a lesbian. Alex runs to Jeremy's house to tell him about her feelings and asks him to kiss her, before realizing Jeremy's friends were behind the door and heard everything. She proceeds to run home and learns that Claire went through her phone, making her furious.

Meanwhile, Gloria (Sofía Vergara) starts cooking traditional Colombian meals in honor of her recently deceased grandmother, which Jay (Ed O'Neill) makes fun of. After realizing that Gloria is upset Jay decides to help her cook, whereupon Gloria uses tricks to get revenge on Jay.

While shopping for a new shirt, Mitchell (Jesse Tyler Ferguson) rejects a kiss from Cameron (Eric Stonestreet) prompting a confrontation about Mitchell's problem with public displays of affection. Mitchell retaliates by commenting on Cameron's neediness.

Soon the whole family comes together to honor Gloria's grandmother, but the party turns south when Mitchell avoids another kiss from Cameron. The family then realizes that Mitchell's aversion to kissing in public is due to Jay being emotionally closed off. Phil then runs down the stairs after printing a picture of Gloria's grandmother for Jay. Jay's response provides more evidence as to why Mitchell will not show PDA. In order to stifle their criticism, Jay kisses Mitchell and then Claire, with Mitchell and Cameron kissing in the background.

After the party, Claire finally tells Alex the truth about her past. Alex is still initially angry, but her attitude softens when she and Jeremy decide to wait before kissing. The episode ends with an epilogue by Gloria.

== Production and broadcast ==
"The Kiss" was written by Abraham Higginbotham and directed by Scott Ellis. It is Abraham Higginbotham's first writing credit as he is part of the new writers who joined at the beginning of the production season.

The episode guest starred Aaron Sanders as Jeremy, the boy Alex likes. Abraham had previously worked with Jesse Tyler Ferguson on the short lived sitcom, Do Not Disturb. It was also the fourth episode made and was filmed during late-August. The episode originally aired September 29, 2010.

The episode addresses criticism the show had garnered for the lack of physical affection exhibited by Cameron and Mitchell in the first season. In response to the controversy, producers released a statement that a season two episode would address Mitchell's discomfort with public displays of affection. Executive producer and co-creator Steven Levitan has said that it was "unfortunate" that the issue had arisen, since the show's writers had always planned on such a scene "as part of the natural development of the show." Eric Stonestreet, who plays Cameron, says the episode isn't "driven by anything political or motivated by a movement."

The episode was rerun on October 1, 2010, the Friday after its original airing.

== Cultural references ==
When Alex works up the nerve to tell Jeremy that she is attracted to him, she says, "I'm just a girl standing in front of a boy, asking for him to like her", before realizing to her embarrassment that it is a line from the film Notting Hill, which she nonetheless calls an "underrated movie". Cameron makes up a game called "kiss buggy", a parody of "punch buggy".

== Reception ==
=== Ratings ===
In its original American broadcast, "The Kiss" was viewed by an estimated 11.877 million viewers and received a 4.6 rating/13% share. This means that it was seen by 4.6% of all 18- to 49-year-olds, and 13% of all 18- to 49-year-olds watching television at the time of the broadcast. This marked a twelve percent decline in the ratings from the season premiere, "The Old Wagon". Despite this, the episode became the highest-rated show on Wednesday and the third highest-rated episode of the series so far. "The Kiss" was the most-watched scripted show for the week of broadcast among adults aged 18–49, and the twenty fourth most-watched show among all viewers.

=== Reviews ===
"The Kiss" received generally positive reviews from critics.

Eric Stonestreet who plays Cameron called the episode "smart and perfect".

Joel Keller of TV Squad gave the episode a positive review naming "Phil squeal-gasped like a girl when Jay asked him for help with the printer." the best moment.

Donna Bowman from The A.V. Club called it a "pretty solid episode" giving it a B.

Lesley Savage of Entertainment Weekly stated "Tonight's episode brought on the laughs ("Slap the chicken!"), but it also managed to be touching without leaving us feeling queasy". She also named Ed O'Neill the best part of the episode.

James Poniewozik of Time liked the main plot and its subtle nature, but wished "the rest of the episode around it had been stronger".

Alan Sepinwall of HitFix praised the fact that the kiss was in the background comparing it to better than the "ghoulish" episode of Cougar Town.

Tom Maursad of The Dallas Morning News stated in his review "the episode was full of really funny moments".

Matt Roush gave the episode a positive and praised Cameron's pratfall calling it "perfect slapstick".
