= Our Children, Ourselves =

- Modern Family episode
- Cameron (Eric Stonestreet) needs his moment after Mitchell (Jesse Tyler Ferguson) tells him that he might have an 8 year old son
- Episode no.: Season 2 Episode 12
- Directed by: Adam Shankman
- Written by: Dan O'Shannon; Bill Wrubel
- Production code: 2ARG10
- Original air date: January 12, 2011

Guest appearances
- Mary Lynn Rajskub as Tracy; Stephnie Weir as Mrs. Hoffman; Adam Kulbersh as Mr. Hoffman; Mark Povinelli as Bobby; Ajay Mehta as Vish Patel; Anjali Bhimani as Nina Patel

Episode chronology
← Previous "Slow Down Your Neighbors"	Next → "Caught in the Act"
- Modern Family season 2

"Our Children, Ourselves" is the 12th episode of the second season of the American television comedy series, Modern Family and the 36th overall episode of the series. Executive producers Dan O'Shannon & Bill Wrubel wrote the episode, and Adam Shankman directed it. The episode originally aired on the American Broadcasting Company (ABC) in the United States on January 12, 2011. It featured guest star Mary Lynn Rajskub as Mitchell's ex-girlfriend.

In this episode, the dedication of Alex to learning makes Phil and Claire question themselves. Gloria tries to meet new friends. Mitchell runs into an ex-girlfriend while out with his current boyfriend, Cameron.

"Our Children, Ourselves" received generally positive reviews from television critics with many praising the "twist ending" to Mitchell and Cameron's storyline. According to the Nielsen Media Research, the episode was viewed by 11.12 million households during its original broadcast, and received a 4.2 rating/10 percent share among viewers in the 18–49 demographic and became the second highest-rated ABC program of the original week it aired after Grey's Anatomy.

Sarah Hyland does not appear in the episode.

== Plot ==
At the Dunphy house, Phil (Ty Burrell) and Claire (Julie Bowen) become worried that Alex (Ariel Winter) is studying too much. The two attempt to get her to take a break and eventually have to force her to do so. Alex eventually gets the second-highest grade in the class, behind a classmate named Sanjay Patel. Alex believes this is due to the fact that Sanjay has a doctor and a professor for parents, while she must do her best with what she was given. This statement offends Phil and Claire, with Claire starting to think they are holding their children back.

Later when they go to the movies, they run into Sanjay's parents who are there to see a French movie. Phil and Claire decide to follow them to encourage their kids. Midway through the movie Phil leaves to watch Croctopus 3D, the film they originally intended to see, since they both are fans of cheesy horror films involving monsters. Phil has fun at his movie while Claire falls asleep at the highly acclaimed French one. After waking her up, Phil tells her that Alex still had one of the highest grades in the class, and dumb parents do not have kids that smart. Claire is reassured and they leave for home after seeing that the "bright Dr. Patel" cannot validate his parking ticket.

Mitchell (Jesse Tyler Ferguson) and Cameron (Eric Stonestreet) bump into Mitchell's ex-girlfriend, Tracy (Mary Lynn Rajskub) at a mall. Mitchell suggest hanging out, but she decides against it. Later, they see Tracy with what appears to be an eight-year-old red-headed child (seen only from behind), whose approximate age would match the last time Tracy and Mitchell saw each other (and the only time Mitchell had sex with a woman). Mitchell tells this to Cameron at dinner, making him anxious. He eventually agrees with Mitchell that they should meet the child, who they are sure is his son. However, they then realize that he actually is a little person (Mark Povinelli) and Tracy's husband. The situation becomes more awkward when he opens his present from Mitchell and Cameron, a "Little Slugger" baseball glove.

Meanwhile, the Hoffmans, a couple that Gloria (Sofía Vergara) and Jay (Ed O'Neill) Pritchett met on a vacation, come to visit them much to Jay's openly (and Gloria's more discreet) chagrin. He eventually tells them his true feelings not knowing that they were spending the night at their house. The couple decides to leave in a cab, as Gloria comes down to apologize they give her a copy of Gabriel García Márquez's "One Hundred Years of Solitude" that they had signed by the author specially for her, so she convinces them to stay by telling them that Jay's "mind is going away". In the morning, Jay decides to apologize to the Hoffmans; however, during his apology he drinks from a prank glass that Manny gave him, ending in him being covered in orange juice. The Hoffmans leave believing that Jay is growing senile and admiring Gloria for enduring such a situation.

== Production ==
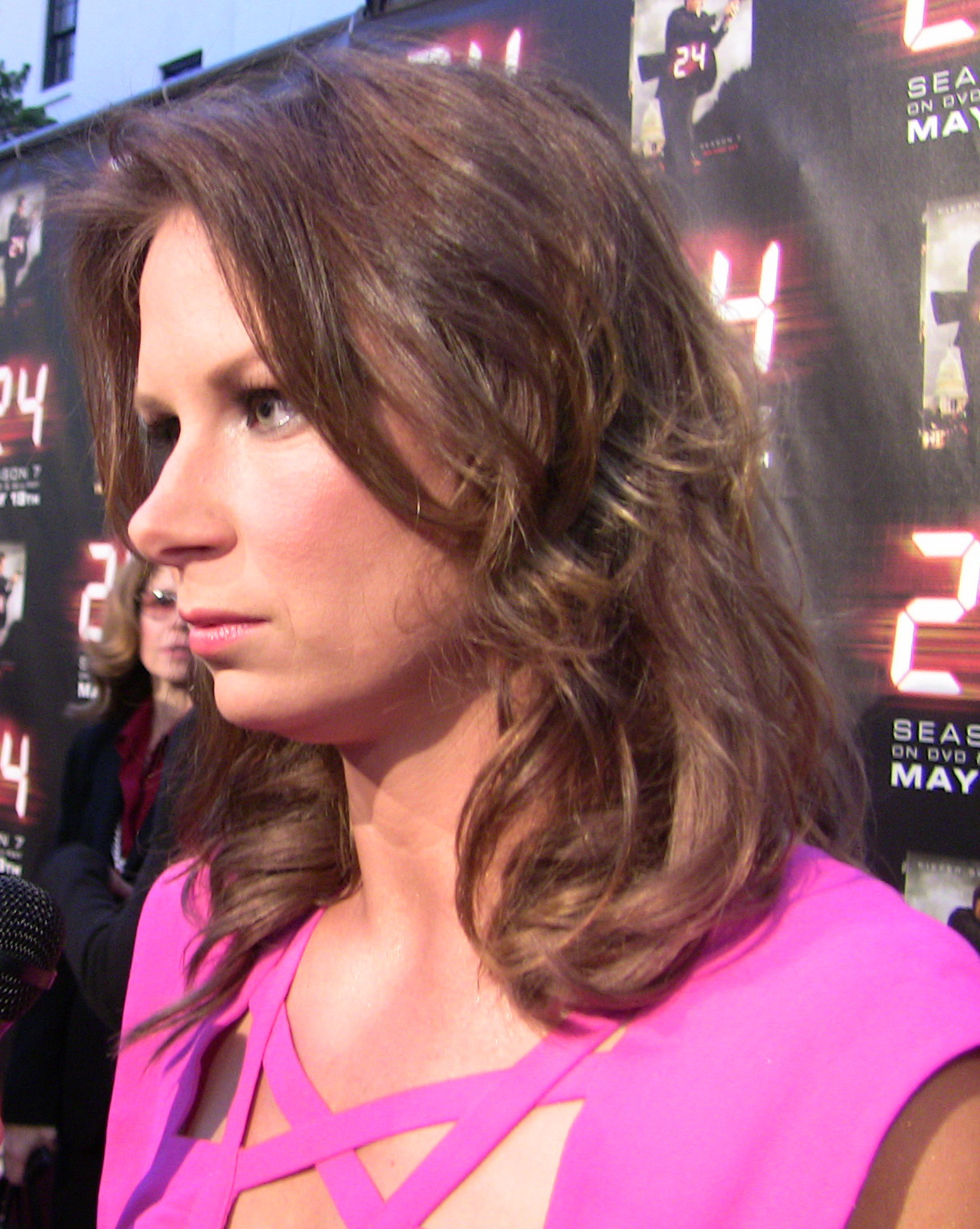
Mary Lynn Rajskub guest starred as Mitchell's ex-girlfriend.

"Our Children, Ourselves" was written by executive producers, Dan O'Shannon and Bill Wrubel. The episode was also directed by Adam Shankman. This episode was the second script collaboration by O'Shannon and Wrubel, who co-wrote the episode "Airport 2010". "Our Children, Ourselves" was filmed on October 13, and October 15, 2010.

In October 2010, TV Guide reported that Mary Lynn Rajskub had been cast as Mitchell's ex-girlfriend. She filmed her appearance on October 13, 2010. Rajskub later said in an interview on Lopez Tonight that she had gone through the same experience: "I had this guy, I think I was in 7th or 8th grade... we had this make out session [...] he pulled away abruptly and I never saw him again. Then 20 years later he facebooked me. Totally gay".

The episode aired on ABC in the United States on January 12, 2011. When the episode aired, the airtime was pushed 20 minutes later than its usual time slot due to Barack Obama's speech about the 2011 Tucson shooting.

== Reception ==
=== Ratings ===
In its original American broadcast, "Our Children, Ourselves" was seen by an estimated 11.12 million households and received a 4.2 rating/10% share among adults between the ages of 18 and 49. This means that it was seen by 4.2% of all 18- to 49-year-olds, and 10% of all 18- to 49-year-olds watching television at the time of the broadcast. This made it the highest-rated program on Wednesday, according to the Nielsen Media Research. The episode received a drop from the previous episode, "Slow Down Your Neighbors", possibly because of the 20-minute delay in its starting time. Despite this, the episode became the second highest-rated ABC show after Grey's Anatomy and the finished seventh in the ratings the week it premiered.

=== Reviews ===
The episode received mostly positive reviews, with many praising the ending to Mitchell and Cameron's storyline.

TV Squad writer Joel Keller gave the episode a positive review, writing that it had "funny moments", but pointed out that "all of them left me wanting some more information to round things out."

John Teti of The A.V. Club called it "not a very good episode" and mainly criticized the Delgado–Pritchett storyline, comparing it to "every episode of Three’s Company ever." Teti ultimately gave the episode a C+.

Rachael Maddux of New York praised the episode for letting the characters "out of their primly landscaped domiciles to interact with the other batty folks of the world".

Matt Roush of TV Guide wrote that the episode's story lines were "all winners". Joyce Eng and KMate Stanhope, also from TV Guide, later named the conclusion to Mitchell and Cameron's storyline the best moment of the week, January 6 to January 13, 2011.

Entertainment Weekly writer Lesley Savage commented that while the episode wasn't a good follow up to "Slow Down Your Neighbors", the ending to the Pritchett-Tucker storyline was "pretty darn funny, and possibly a little un-PC".

James Poniewozik of Time wrote that while the plot came "straight out of the Wacky Misunderstanding School of Sitcomedy" it was still a satisfying episode calling Phil and Claire's storyline "the most amusing storyline".
