= Mother Tucker (Modern Family) =

- Modern Family episode
- Episode no.: Season 2 Episode 9
- Directed by: Michael Spiller
- Written by: Paul Corrigan; Brad Walsh
- Production code: 2ARG07
- Original air date: November 24, 2010

Guest appearances
- Celia Weston as Barb Tucker; Reid Ewing as Dylan

Episode chronology
| ← Previous "Manny Get Your Gun" | Next → "Dance Dance Revelation" |
- Modern Family season 2

"Mother Tucker" is the ninth episode of the second season of the American sitcom Modern Family, and the 33rd episode of the series overall. It originally aired on November 24, 2010 on ABC. The episode was written by Paul Corrigan & Brad Walsh and was directed by Michael Spiller.

In the episode, Mitchell tries to tell Cameron how he feels uncomfortable with his mom, Barb Tucker. Meanwhile, Haley breaks up with Dylan much to Phil's dismay. Jay has a little stomachache and gets exacerbated when he and Manny look it up on the internet.

"Mother Tucker" received mixed reviews from critics with Joel Keller of TV Squad calling it "among the weakest of the season, if not the weakest". According to the Nielsen Media Research, the episode received a significant drop from the previous episode due to it airing the night before Thanksgiving. Nolan Gould does not appear in the episode.

== Plot ==
The episode begins with Haley (Sarah Hyland) taking tutoring lessons with a smart boy named David (Thomas Kasp). Claire (Julie Bowen) and Alex (Ariel Winter) soon leave the house before Claire realizes she left her shopping list. When she arrives back in the house she finds Haley making out with David.

Haley decides it may be time to break up with Dylan (Reid Ewing), which she does through a text message, a decision everyone agrees with except for Phil (Ty Burrell). Phil decides that Dylan might need someone to lean on so he and Dylan decide to get Phil a guitar and drink at a juice bar. Haley initially thinks he's on a date with a girl (because of Phil's sweat jacket, which is very feminine) and wants him back. Unfortunately, Dylan says he needs some time "dating Dylan", making both her and Phil sad.

At the Pritchett house, Jay (Ed O'Neill) is having a stomachache. Manny (Rico Rodriguez) constantly asks Jay about the symptoms and fills them in into a medical website. Jay worries he might have a serious problem. However, Gloria (Sofía Vergara) initially dismisses it because in Colombia she would never rush to the hospital for every little thing and assumes that Jay is just exaggerating. Jay goes to the hospital and is diagnosed with acute appendicitis. He requires emergency surgery, causing Gloria to panic since she has come close to killing her husband (for the second time as she puts it).

Meanwhile, Cameron's (Eric Stonestreet) mom, Barb Tucker (Celia Weston), arrives to the Tucker-Pritchett house. This makes Cameron happy and Mitchell (Jesse Tyler Ferguson) uncomfortable, due to Barb's inappropriate touching on him. Following Claire's advice, Mitchell tries to prove to Cameron that his mother is more than handsy but every time he tries to do it, Cameron is looking the other way. When finally realizing about the situation is when Mitchell is sticking his fanny for Barb to touch. Mitchell eventually confronts Cameron about his mother's inappropriate touching, not realizing that she is behind him. This hurts Barb's feeling before she finally realizes she has touched him inappropriately and apologizes, unfortunately this happens while Mitchell is in the bathtub.

== Production ==
The episode was written by Paul Corrigan and Brad Walsh, their second writing credit for the season after "Earthquake". The episode was directed by Michael Spiller who had previously directed seven previous episodes of the season.

The episode guest stars Celia Weston as Cameron's mother, Barb Tucker. On September 7, 2010, William Keck of TV Guide reported that Celia Weston would play Cameron's mother. Celia stated that her character "is totally accepting of Cameron and Mitchell." Eric Stonestreet, who plays Cameron Tucker, also described Barb as "somebody who made him (Cameron) the person he is". Celia had previously worked with casting director Jeff Greenberg and creators Christopher Lloyd and Steven Levitan on Frasier in 2004.

== Reception ==
=== Ratings ===
In its original American broadcast, "Mother Tucker" was viewed by an estimated 10.53 million viewers and received a 3.7 rating/12% share among adults between the ages of 18 and 49 becoming the lowest rated episode of the season. The episode received a significant due to it airing Thanksgiving Eve. Despite the low rating, the episode became the highest rated series of the night it aired. The episode also became the tenth highest rated series of the week it aired in the 18-49 demographic.

=== Reviews ===
"Mother Tucker" received mixed reviews.

Joel Keller of TV Squad called the episode "among the weakest of the season, if not the weakest". He felt that while the Dunphy's had the "best (plot) of the night" he also felt "it was also uneven".

Emily VanDerWerff of The A.V. Club rated the episode with a B+. She felt that it "wasn't the strongest episode of this show ever, but it was solid across the board, with more than enough laughs to buoy it along". She also said it "continued season two's streak of improvements"

Rachael Maddux of New York stated in her review that "After two great episodes in a row following a wonky start, Modern Family looks like it finally might be returning to its first-season form."
