= Mary Lynn Rajskub =

American actress and comedian

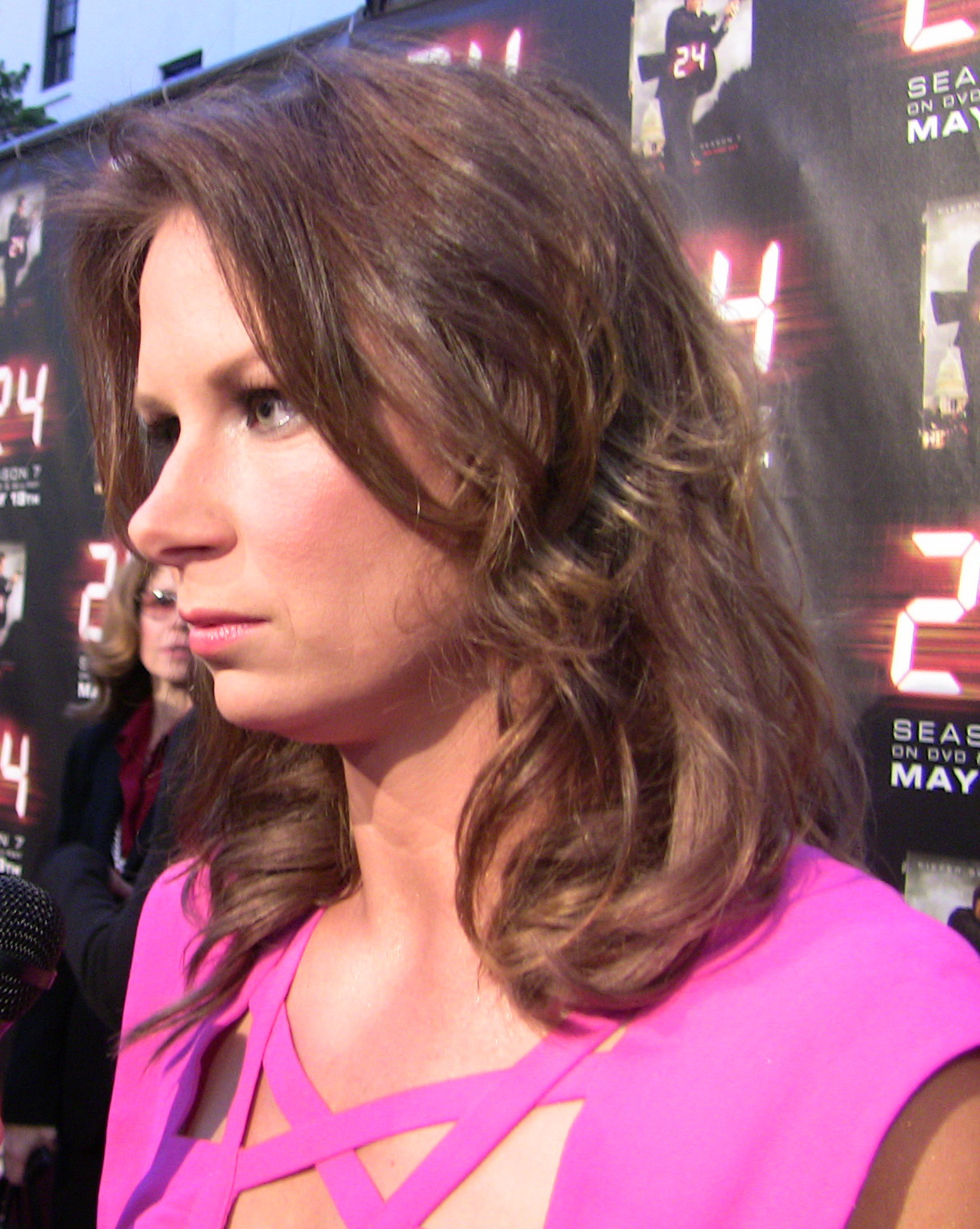
- Rajskub at a screening of the 24 season 7 finale at the Wadsworth Theatre in Los Angeles, May 2009
- Born: June 22, 1971 (age 55); Detroit, Michigan, U.S.
- Education: Center for Creative Studies; San Francisco Art Institute
- Occupations: Actress; comedian
- Years active: 1995–present
- Spouse: Matthew Rolph (m. 2009; div. 2019)
- Children: 1

Mary Lynn Rajskub (/ˈraɪskəb/; born June 22, 1971) is an American actress and comedian who is best known for portraying Chloe O'Brian in the action thriller series 24 and Gail the Snail in It's Always Sunny in Philadelphia. She was a regular cast member on HBO's Mr. Show with Bob and David, appeared in The Larry Sanders Show, Brooklyn Nine-Nine, and Veronica's Closet, and acted in films including Dude, Where's My Car?, Firewall, Sweet Home Alabama, Punch-Drunk Love, Mysterious Skin, Little Miss Sunshine, Sunshine Cleaning, Safety Not Guaranteed, and The Kings of Summer, among others.

== Early life ==
Rajskub was born in Detroit and grew up in Trenton, Michigan south of Detroit. She has two older sisters and is the daughter of Betty and Tony Rajskub, a pharmacist's assistant and a pipefitter, respectively.

One of her childhood inspirations was the television series Moonlighting. Rajskub attended the Center for Creative Studies in Detroit and later the San Francisco Art Institute in San Francisco. During the early nineties, she often performed at various open mics in the city. She later moved to Los Angeles working as a waitress in a Hard Rock Cafe.

== Career ==
Rajskub's first part was as an Oompa-Loompa in a community theater production of Willy Wonka & the Chocolate Factory, and her first starring role was Raggedy Ann. In 1996 she appeared in music videos for the songs "The Good Life" by Weezer and "The New Pollution" by Beck. She was one of the original cast members of Mr. Show with Bob and David. From 1996–1998, she had a recurring role on the HBO series The Larry Sanders Show as booking assistant Mary Lou Collins, appearing in 18 episodes. She later had a recurring role on the 1990s sitcom Veronica's Closet on NBC, playing Chloe for 15 episodes.

Her most notable role is CTU systems analyst Chloe O'Brian on 24, which she joined in 2003 at the start of the show's third season. Her character was a hit with viewers and critics and was one of the few cast members to return in the show's fourth season. After being a regular guest star for two seasons, Rajskub became a main cast member in the show's fifth season. By the end of the series, she was the lead female, with top billing second only to Kiefer Sutherland. Her character also had the honor of saying the final words of the series in the season 8 series finale. Rajskub and Sutherland appeared briefly as their 24 characters in a 2007 episode, "24 Minutes", of The Simpsons, an animated Fox series. In August 2013, it was announced that she would reprise her Chloe O'Brian role in the 2014 limited series 24: Live Another Day.

Rajskub appeared in Kelsey Grammer's The Sketch Show on Fox Television, The King of Queens as a character named Priscilla, and in numerous films including Mysterious Skin, Legally Blonde 2, Sweet Home Alabama, Dude, Where's My Car?, Man on the Moon, Punch-Drunk Love, The Anniversary Party, Firewall, Little Miss Sunshine, music videos for Beck, Weezer and Sheryl Crow, as well as portraying a blind woman in the film Road Trip.

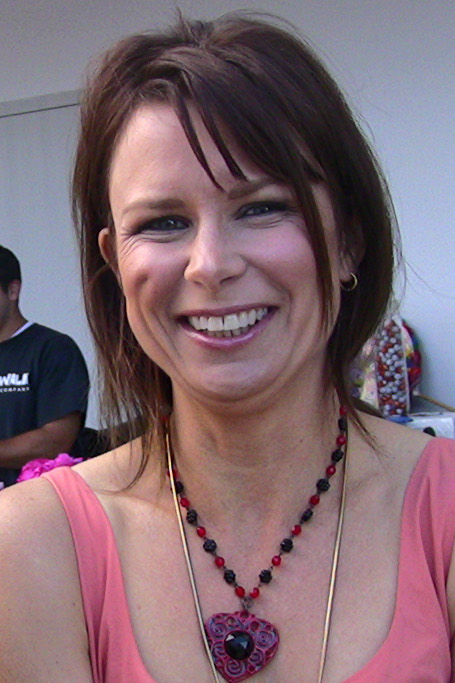
Rajskub being interviewed at the 2011 MTV Movie Awards gifting lounge in Universal City, California

Rajskub was part of a comic duo with Karen Kilgariff called Girls Guitar Club. In 2006, she made a cameo appearance in "Partings", the 6th season finale of Gilmore Girls, playing a trobairitz looking for her big break. (Rajskub had previously appeared on Gilmore Girls as the female lead in A Film by Kirk, a short film made by the character Kirk Gleason.) She has volunteered as an actress with the Young Storytellers Program. She has an educational background as a painter, having attended the San Francisco Art Institute.

Rajskub has been nominated twice for a Screen Actors Guild Award; once in 2005, and again in 2007 for Outstanding Performance by an Ensemble in a Drama Series. She guest-starred on Flight of the Conchords episode "Prime Minister" as Karen, an Art Garfunkel fanatic. She guest-starred as "Gail the Snail" in an episode of It's Always Sunny in Philadelphia titled "The Gang Gives Frank an Intervention", and reprised the role in the ninth-season finale, "The Gang Squashes Their Beefs," and season thirteen's "The Gang Beats Boggs: Ladies Reboot." In 2009, she also appeared in the film Julie & Julia as Sarah, one of Julie Powell's close friends. In 2010, Rajskub performed stand-up on John Oliver's New York Stand Up Show. In June 2010, she appeared in the "Lovesick" episode during the second season of the USA series Royal Pains.

From July through October 2010, she performed in her solo show, Mary Lynn Spreads Her Legs, at the Steve Allen Theater in Los Angeles. F. Kathleen Foley in a Los Angeles Times review wrote "that cheerfully vulgar title sums up the overall tone, which is often breezily obscene". The show, written by Rajskub with help from director/developer Amit Itelman, was inspired by Rajskub's experiences with pregnancy, childbirth, and early motherhood.

In January 2011, Rajskub guest-starred in the episode "Our Children, Ourselves" on the second season of ABC's Modern Family. In the fall of 2011, she appeared in the short-lived sitcom How to Be a Gentleman. Also in 2011, her web series, Dicki, began airing on My Damn Channel. Dicki is based on a number of people that Rajskub grew up with in and around Michigan. The title character is a 40-year-old woman who lives at home with her parents, makes crafts, and takes her art seriously. Dicki has been one of My Damn Channel's most successful web series to date. The first season concluded in November 2011, but a second season is currently in development. Rajskub performed in the June 2012 edition of Don't Tell My Mother! (Live Storytelling), a monthly showcase in which celebrities share true stories they would never want their mothers to know. In 2012 she began hosting a podcast on the Nerdist Network called Kickin' it Mary Lynn Style. In 2013, Rajskub appeared in the fourth season of Arrested Development in a silent yet well-received role as Heartfire, a character Rajskub has said "speak[s] from the heart, but do[es]n't use any words." In the same year Rajskub also appeared in the web series All Growz Up with Melinda Hill.

Rajskub was featured in a music video for the Self song "Looks and Money" in 2015, directed by Dave Foley and starring himself with Rajskub. She appeared on Ken Reid's TV Guidance Counselor podcast on March 27, 2015. In August 2016, Rajskub appeared at the Edinburgh Festival Fringe in Edinburgh, Scotland in 24 Hours With Mary Lynn Rajskub. A comedy special which dealt with issues of domestic life as well as her stardom and work in various independent ventures, the performance was well-received by both critics and fans.

In 2017, Rajskub appeared in the first season of the Adult Swim series Dream Corp LLC, playing Patient 46 in the episode "Are You Down With OCD?". Her appearance involved two leading characters, T.E.R.R.Y. (Stephen Merchant) and Patient 88 (Nicholas Rutherford), competing for her attention. Rajskub appeared in the 2018 comedy Night School, starring Kevin Hart and Tiffany Haddish. The movie received middling reviews, with Michael Phillips of The Chicago Tribune noting that "the actors aren't the problem with Night School; the material is."

In 2021, Rajskub released a 49-minute comedy special called Mary Lynn Rajskub: Live from the Pandemic. The same year, she appeared in Amazon's science fiction movie The Tomorrow War, starring Chris Pratt, Yvonne Strahovski and J. K. Simmons. Rajskub also had a four-episode role in the Hulu series The Dropout, a dramatization of the Theranos scandal starring Amanda Seyfried; Rajskub played Lorraine Fuisz, wife of William H. Macy's Richard Fuisz. In 2022, Rajskub released her first book, Fame-ish: My Life at the Edge of Stardom. In 2023, she was a contestant on Celebrity Wheel of Fortune, where she was a fan favorite. An official clip of her and fellow actor Paul Scheer accrued over two million views on TikTok.

== Personal life ==
Rajskub dated David Cross, who introduced her to Mr. Show, and left the program when they broke up after the end of the second season. She and music producer Jon Brion dated for five years until they broke up in the fall of 2002. Rajskub later had a relationship with comedian Duncan Trussell.

Rajskub met personal trainer Matthew Rolph when he approached her after one of her comedy set performances. They began dating and she became pregnant three months later. Their son was born in 2008. Rajskub and Rolph married on August 1, 2009, in an impromptu wedding in Las Vegas. She filed for divorce in August 2019. Rajskub is bisexual.

== Filmography ==
Key
†	Denotes works that have not yet been released

=== Film ===
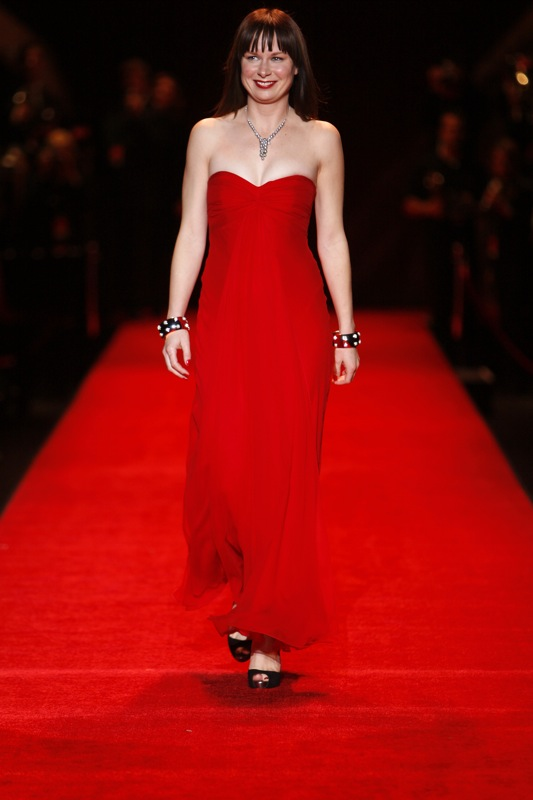
Rajskub at The Heart Truth Fashion Show, February 1, 2008

Year	Title	Role	Notes
1996	The Truth About Cats & Dogs	Female Radio Caller	Voice
1997	Who's the Caboose?	Cheeseball	
1998	The Thin Pink Line	Suzy Smokestack	
1999	Magnolia	Janet	Voice
1999	Man on the Moon	Friday's Mary	
2000	Road Trip	Blind Brenda	
2000	Dude, Where's My Car?	Zelmina	
2000	Sunset Strip	Eileen	
2001	Storytelling	Melinda	
2001	The Anniversary Party	Mary-Lynn	
2002	Punch-Drunk Love	Elizabeth	
2002	Sweet Home Alabama	Dorothea	
2002	Run Ronnie Run!	Herself	
2003	Legally Blonde 2: Red, White & Blonde	Reena Giuliani	
2003	Claustrophobia	Grace	
2004	Mysterious Skin	Avalyn Friesen	
2004	Helter Skelter	Lynette "Squeaky" Fromme	
2006	Firewall	Janet Stone	
2006	Little Miss Sunshine	Pageant Assistant Pam	
2006	Grilled	Renee	
2007	Humble Pie	Peggy Orbison	
2008	Sunshine Cleaning	Lynn	
2009	Julie & Julia	Sarah	
2010	24: Chloe's Arrest	Chloe O'Brian	Short film
2012	Safety Not Guaranteed	Bridget	
2013	The Kings of Summer	Captain Davis	
2015	Sex, Death and Bowling	Kim Wells	
2017	Wilson	Jodie	
2017	In Search of Fellini	Kerri	
2018	Benjamin	Jeanette	
2018	Night School	Theresa	
2018	Cold Brook	Rachel	
2019	A World Away	Principal Garcia	
2020	Dinner in America	Connie	
2021	Hero Mode	Laura	
2021	The Tomorrow War	Norah	
2022	Please Baby Please	Lois	
2022	Daniel's Gotta Die	Mia Powell	
2023	Dashing Through the Snow	Mary	
2024	Shell	Casting Director	

=== Television ===
Year	Title	Role	Notes
1995–1996	Mr. Show with Bob and David	Various Characters	10 episodes
1996–1998	The Larry Sanders Show	Mary Lou Collins	18 episodes
1997	The Weird Al Show	Weather Woman	Episode: "Talent Show"
1997	Over the Top	Linda	Episode: "The Bee Story"
1998	NewsRadio	Waitress	Episode: "The Secret of Management"
1999	Tracey Takes On...	Traffic School Girl	Episode: "Lies"
1999	Shasta McNasty	Diana	Episode: "Pilot"
1999–2000	Veronica's Closet	Chloe	15 episodes
2001	Just Shoot Me!	Penny	Episode: "Maya Judging Amy"
2002	Gilmore Girls	Girlfriend in Kirk's film	Episode: "Teach Me Tonight"
2002	The King of Queens	Priscilla Stasna	Episode: "Arthur, Spooner"
2003–2010	24	Chloe O'Brian	Main role (season 3-8); 125 episodes
2003	Good Morning, Miami	Hollis	Episode: "I Second That Promotion"
2004	Home Movies	Penny (voice)	Episode: "Those Bitches Tried to Cheat Me"
2005	The Sketch Show	Various Characters	6 episodes
2006	Gilmore Girls	Town Troubadour	Episode: "Partings"
2007	Human Giant	Mindy	2 episodes
2007	The Simpsons	Chloe O'Brian (voice)	Episode: "24 Minutes"
2008	The Middleman	Dr. Gibbs	Episode: "The Pilot Episode Sanction"
2009	Flight of the Conchords	Karen	Episode: "Prime Minister"
2009–2023	It's Always Sunny in Philadelphia	Gail the Snail	4 episodes
2010	Royal Pains	Blake	Episode: "Lovesick"
2010	The Benson Interruption	Herself	Episode #1.2
2010–2013	Chelsea Lately	Herself	9 episodes
2011	Modern Family	Tracy	Episode: "Our Children, Ourselves"
2011	Raising Hope	Tanya	Episode: "The Cultish Personality"
2011	How to Be a Gentleman	Janet	9 episodes
2012	The L.A. Complex	Herself	Episode: "Down in L.A."
2012	Dirty Work	Roxy	3 episodes
2012	The Burn with Jeff Ross	Herself	Episode: "Jimmy Kimmel/Jim Norton/Bobby Lee/Mary Lynn Rajskub"
2012	Mash Up	Herself	TV movie
2012	Grey's Anatomy	Marion Steiner	Episode: "Migration"
2013	The Mentalist	Susie Hamplin	Episode: "Days of Wine and Roses"
2013	Newsreaders	Laney Trammings	Episode: "Fit Town, Fat Town"
2013	New Girl	Peg	Episode: "Winston's Birthday"
2013	Arrested Development	Heartfire	2 episodes
2013–2014	2 Broke Girls	Bebe	5 episodes
2014	TripTank	Marilyn (voice)	Episode: "Crossing the Line"
2014	Californication	Goldie	4 episodes
2014	24: Live Another Day	Chloe O'Brian	12 episodes (limited series)
2014	Talking Dead	Herself	Episode: "Four Walls and a Roof"
2014–2017	@midnight	Herself	15 episodes
2015	Maron	Herself	Episode: "Ex-Pod"
2015–2016	Brooklyn Nine-Nine	Genevieve Mirren-Carter	5 episodes
2015	Highston	Jean Liggetts	Pilot
2015	W/ Bob & David	Chef Krissie	Episode #1.3
2016	The Girlfriend Experience	Erin Roberts	10 episodes
2016	Take My Wife	Mary Lynn	Episode: "Opener"
2016	Those Who Can't	Summer	3 episodes
2016	Dream Corp LLC	Patient #046	Episode: "You Down with OCD?"
2016	Drunk History	Effie Cherry	Episode: "Shit Shows"
2017	The Guest Book	Lynn	Episode: "Story Two"
2018	Detroiters	Margaret	Episode: "Lois"
2018	Rob Riggle's Ski Master Academy	Reporter	5 episodes
2018	Hawaii Five-0	Crystal	Episode: "A 'ohe mea 'imi a ka maka"
2019	Now Apocalypse	Frank	2 episodes
2019	How High 2	Ana Cheever	Television film
2020	Criminal Minds	Brenda Hacker	Episode: "Rusty"
2021	Ten Year Old Tom	Rhonda (voice)	Episode: "The Spelling Bee is Rigged/Dakota's Dad"
2021	Scooby-Doo, Where Are You Now!	Producer Bryn (voice)	Television special
2022	The Dropout	Lorraine Fuisz	4 episodes
2022	Big Shot	Charlie	Episode: "Tipoff"
2023	Accused	Tess	Episode: "Brenda's Story"
2024	Hell's Kitchen	Herself	Episode: "#HellishHangover"
2024	After Midnight	Herself	Episode #8
2025–present	North of North	Helen	16 episodes
