= Mark Povinelli =

American actor

- Born: August 9, 1971 (age 55); Elyria, Ohio, U.S.
- Education: Miami University
- Occupations: Actor, social activist
- Years active: 1998 - present
- Height: 115 cm (3 ft 9 in)
- Spouse: Heather Davis (m. 1998)
- Children: 2

Mark Povinelli (born August 9, 1971) is an American stage, television and movie actor who also does occasional stunt work. Povinelli is also a noted social activist advocating for the rights of others with dwarfism. In June 2017, Povinelli was elected President of the Little People of America, an organization started in 1957 by Billy Barty, which promotes awareness, advocacy and medical assistance for individuals with forms of dwarfism. Povinelli stands 3’ 9½" and weighs 75 pounds (115 cm, 34 kg) as a consequence of spondyloepiphyseal dysplasia congenita (SEDc), a skeletal dysplasia caused by a mutation in the COL2A1 (type II collagen) gene.

His repertory encompasses drama, comedy, and fantasy. He has appeared in a wide range of productions, from stage plays by William Shakespeare and Ben Jonson to roles in television series such as Modern Family and Boardwalk Empire, as well as in popular movies including The Polar Express.

== Life and career ==
Povinelli was born in Elyria, Ohio, and is the youngest of four children. His parents and siblings are average-size. His older brother Brian Povinelli is a marketer who inspired Mark's acting career. He is of Italian descent. Povinelli graduated from Our Lady of Good Counsel High School in Olney, Maryland in 1989, and then graduated in 1993 from Miami University with a degree in Mass Communications and a minor in Theater Acting. Onstage in 2003 in Lee Breuer's production of Henrik Ibsen's A Doll's House, retitled Mabou Mines DollHouse, Povinelli drew praise from The New York Times: "The men embody small-minded convention and stunted possibilities...Mr. Povinelli makes us feel Torvald's repressive sexual virility at every turn." He has characterized his approach to acting for The Village Voice: "Being so tremendously different provides you with an analytical depth ... Like any actor, I try to bring as much of myself to the role I'm playing as possible. Every day I go out I'm made aware of my size. Why should I deny myself the richness of that experience when I go onstage?"

Povinelli starred opposite Robert Pattinson and Oscar winners Reese Witherspoon and Christoph Waltz in the 2011 film Water for Elephants, playing the role of Kinko.

In 2012, he appeared in Mirror Mirror, which starred Julia Roberts, Armie Hammer, and Lily Collins. In the same year, Povinelli was cast as a series regular on the television series Are You There, Chelsea?, starring Laura Prepon. This made him the first little person ever to be cast as a series regular on a network studio sitcom.

In 2015-2016 he had a recurring role as "The Cat" in the Amazon Studios original Mad Dogs, which also starred Steve Zahn and Michael Imperioli.

Mark starred in the one man show, The Return of Benjamin Lay written by Naomi Wallace and Marcus Rediker in London in 2023. The play imagines noted abolitionist Benjamin Lay returning to modern times to challenge today's audiences as he did in the 1700s. Touring the East Coast Mark was nominated for a Drama Desk Award - Outstanding Solo Performance for his work during his NY run.

Since 2014, Mark has co-hosted LA Talk Radio's "Perfectly Imperfect Radio" program.

== Personal life ==
Povinelli currently resides in Los Angeles, California with his wife, Heather Davis, and their two children. Mark's brother-in-law, Erik Davis, was the 2020 El Presidente of Old Spanish Days Fiesta and is a television executive.

== Works ==
Films:

- 2021: Nightmare Alley - The Major
- 2013: Pawn Shop Chronicles - Harry
- 2012: The Hot Flashes - Coach Paul Lazarini
- 2012: Mirror Mirror - Half Pint
- 2011: Water for Elephants - Kinko / Walter
- 2010: Jackass 3D - Himself
- 2008: Beer for My Horses - Merriweather
- 2007: Epic Movie - Oompa Loompa
- 2006: Employee of the Month - Glen Ross' stunt double
- 2004: The Polar Express - Elf

Television:

- 2018: My Dinner with Hervé - Billy Barty
- 2016: Sigmund and the Sea Monsters - Sigmund
- 2016: Still the King - Santonio Trillions
- 2015: Mad Dogs - The Cat
- 2015: Dog with a Blog - Gary
- 2015: Happyish - JJ Keebler
- 2013: Anger Management - Little Elvis
- 2013: Child of the 70's - Bridges
- 2012: Criminal Minds - Mr. Conrad
- 2012: Breakout Kings - Kurt Peebles
- 2012: Are You There, Chelsea? - Todd, The bartender
- 2011: A.N.T. Farm - Officer 39
- 2011: Modern Family - Bobby, "Our Children, Ourselves"
- 2010: The Whole Truth - Judge Roland Tomassy
- 2010: Boardwalk Empire - Kevin Kiley
- 2010: 'Til Death - Luther (2 episodes)
- 2010: Cold Case - Nathaniel 'Biggie' Jones '71
- 2009: It's Always Sunny in Philadelphia - Tiny (2 episodes)
- 2008: Pushing Daisies - Simon
- 2003: Charmed - Seamus Fitzpatrick
- 2003: The Parkers - Frank Osgood
- 2002: The Hughleys - Norman

Stage:

- 2023: The Return of Benjamin Lay - Benjamin Lay
- 2015 Belle Epoque - Henri de Toulouse-LautrecVivian Beaumont Theater
- 2009: Mabou Mines Dollhouse - Torvald Helmer

== Awards ==
- 2025 Drama Desk Nomination - Outstanding Solo Performance
- 2005 Best Actor - Fantasy at the ShockerFest International Film Festival
