= Dance Dance Revelation =

- Modern Family episode
- Gloria (Sofia Vergara) joins the school dance committee that leads to Claire's (Julie Bowen) jealousy
- Episode no.: Season 2 Episode 10
- Directed by: Gail Mancuso
- Written by: Ilana Wernick
- Production code: 2ARG08
- Original air date: December 8, 2010

Guest appearances
- Danny Trejo as Gus; Mo Mandel as grieving dog owner; Artemis Pebdani as Bethenny; Julie Dretzin as Tyler's mom; Kevin Daniels as Longines

Episode chronology
← Previous "Mother Tucker"	Next → "Slow Down Your Neighbors"
- Modern Family season 2

"Dance Dance Revelation" is the tenth episode of the second season of the sitcom, Modern Family and the 34th overall. It originally aired December 8, 2010 on the ABC. The episode was written by Ilana Wernick and directed by Gail Mancuso.

The episode follows Luke and Manny having their first school dance; Jay and Phil taking them to the mall with disastrous results; Claire's happiness turns into jealousy when Gloria joins the school dance committee. Meanwhile, Cameron and Mitchell learn about Lily biting other kids at the playground.

"Dance Dance Revelation" was watched by 11.075 million viewers in the United States marking a 15% drop among adults between the ages of 18 and 49 from the previous regular original episode. The episode also received mostly positive reviews from critics. Sarah Hyland and Ariel Winter do not appear in the episode.

== Plot ==
It is the day of Luke (Nolan Gould) and Manny's (Rico Rodriguez) first school dance, which is being organized by Claire (Julie Bowen). However, the school appointed Gloria (Sofía Vergara) as co-chair. Claire has been trying to block Gloria from participating by telling her that there was enough people. Gloria comes anyway and Claire soon gets jealous when Gloria starts taking over and everyone really appreciates it and particularly because she manages to get Gus (Danny Trejo), the school's janitor, to do everything that she asks right away. Eventually, during the dance, Claire gets upset at her but after talking things out they both apologize for making the dance a competition.

Meanwhile, Jay (Ed O'Neill) and Phil (Ty Burrell) take Luke and Manny to the mall which turns disastrous. Manny and Luke get into a fight over a teal tie that Manny needed. After having lost a parking space to a person who cut them off, Phil lets a man in front of the line who takes very long, which leads Jay to get cranky over Phil. Phil pretends to go looking for socks but he ends up attacking a cologne salesman (Kevin Daniels) just for spraying him while asking.

While still waiting in line to pay, Jay sees the man that cut them off at the parking lot and wants to give him a piece of his mind to demonstrate to Luke and Manny how his tougher approach will work, but it turns out that the man had no idea that he cut them off because he is very depressed over the death of his dog "Spot", crying all over Jay. Eventually Jay sees he has been rough and apologizes to Phil.

Cameron (Eric Stonestreet) and Mitchell (Jesse Tyler Ferguson) learn from a mom they know that Lily bit her son at the playground. At first they deny this, because they think that they are being blamed for just being gay but they come to realize that it was true after Lily bites Cameron. They decide to look at some ways to discipline her, but Cameron is too soft and proposes to sing a song to Lily about not biting while Mitchell is fond of an idea that he got from the Internet to put pepper in her mouth. After the song, they realize that it does not work. This leads Mitchell and Cameron into a fight where Mitchell bites Cameron and tells him to "sing me a song about it". They soon come to accept that their daughter is not perfect, right after that Lily slaps Mitchell and Cameron starts laughing hysterically.

In the epilogue of the episode, it turns out that the cologne man was Longines, a friend of Cameron and Mitchell's, who turns to them for comfort. Mitchell points out that Longines had it coming because he always sprayed while asking.

== Production ==
"Dance Dance Revelation" is the second episode written by Iiana Wernick. Wernick had previously written the first season finale, "Family Portrait". The episode was also the first episode directed by Gail Mancuso.

The episode features Danny Trejo as the school janitor, Gus. On October 7, 2010, William Keck of TV Guide reported that movie star Danny Trejo was set to guest star as a janitor who befriends Gloria. The episode was originally reported by TV Guide to have Claire become friends with Gus while TV Squad reported that she was to face off with the janitor.

== Reception ==
=== Ratings ===
In its original American broadcast, "Dance Dance Revelation" was viewed by an estimated 11.075 million viewers and received a 4.1 rating/11% share among adults between the ages of 18 and 49 dropping 15% from the previous non-special episode, "Manny Get Your Gun" and is the second lowest rated episode this season just behind "Mother Tucker". Despite the drop the episode was the highest rated episode of the night. The episode became the second highest rated scripted program of the original week it aired after Glee. The episode also became the highest rated show on the ABC network that week.

=== Reviews ===
It’s not unusual for episodes to split the characters up this way among storylines, but the fact that they were kept in these bottles for almost the entire running time created a sense of stasis verging on claustrophobia at times.

— Donna Bowman, The A.V. Club

Since airing, the episode has received positive reviews from critics.

TV Squad writer Joel Keller praised the episode saying that, unlike the previous Christmas-time episode, this episode had "returned to the classic formula that has made this show be so consistent over the last season and a half: big laughs, great acting, and believable emotional payoffs." The A.V. Club writer Donna Bowman was disappointed with "Dance Dance Revelation", saying that the characters seemed separated commenting that "Most of the problem is not with the plot but with the way the characters were kept in separate silos throughout the episode."

Rachel Maddux of New York praised the episode calling it "thoughtful, funny, and well-executed enough to make up for that egregious transgression."
