= Earthquake (Modern Family) =

- Modern Family episode
- Episode no.: Season 2 Episode 3
- Directed by: Michael Spiller
- Written by: Paul Corrigan; Brad Walsh
- Production code: 2ARG01
- Original air date: October 6, 2010

Guest appearances
- Nathan Lane as Pepper Saltzman; Vic Polizos as Dave the plumber

Episode chronology
← Previous "The Kiss"	Next → "Strangers on a Treadmill"
- Modern Family season 2

"Earthquake" is the third episode of the second season of the American Broadcasting Company (ABC) American sitcom, Modern Family and the 27th episode overall. The episode originally aired October 6, 2010. It was written by Paul Corrigan & Brad Walsh and directed by Michael Spiller. It guest starred Nathan Lane as Pepper Saltzman and Vic Polizos as a plumber.

In the episode, an earthquake causes Claire to be stuck in the bathroom with the plumber. Gloria interprets the natural disaster as a sign that God wants Jay to go to church while Mitchell and Cameron use it as an excuse to not attend Pepper's party.

"Earthquake" received positive reviews from critics. The episode also received a nomination for Episode Comedy at the 2010 Writers Guild of America Awards, but ultimately lost.

According to the Nielsen Media Research, the episode received a 4.6 rating/13% share among adults between the ages of 18 and 49 receiving the same rating from the previous episode and also tied for being the highest rated scripted program with Glee.

== Plot ==
Haley (Sarah Hyland) and Claire (Julie Bowen) are arguing about Haley's wanting to go to a party instead of staying home and prepare for her SATs when a plumber (Vic Polizos) arrives. After an earthquake, Claire ends up locked in the bathroom with the plumber and a bookcase is knocked down. Phil (Ty Burrell) realizes that if he can keep Claire in the bathroom long enough he can get the bookcase strapped to the wall like he told Claire he had already done while Haley realizes she can go to the party. Claire though hears her telling Alex (Ariel Winter) about the plan while Alex was blackmailing Haley into driving her to the Museum of Tolerance in exchange for the lie.

Phil convinces Luke (Nolan Gould) that the bookshelf "did not fall". After Phil "tries" to get Claire out, the plumber tells Claire that the reason she is being so controlling to Haley is because Haley is much like her when she was her age, just as his son drove him crazy exactly for the same reason. Claire and the plumber finally get out of the bathroom on their own and Claire questions what took Phil so long. Alex lies for him and says he was helping everybody and checking that there were no gas leaks. Claire believes her and Phil takes Alex to the Museum of Tolerance.

Meanwhile, Cameron (Eric Stonestreet) and Mitchell (Jesse Tyler Ferguson) get ready for Cameron's ex-boyfriend, Pepper Saltzman's (Nathan Lane), new theme party, Oscar Wilde and Crazy Brunch. Unknowing to Pepper, Cameron and Mitchell have grown to dislike his parties because they take a lot of work and one has to assume a character and dress up in costume. While this is happening Mitchell realizes he can use the earthquake as an excuse to get out of the party. Mitchell has Cameron tell Pepper because he is the one who always cancels, but Cameron panics while telling about the extent of the earthquake's damage. Since Pepper is on his way to their house, Mitchell starts breaking items to match Cameron's description of the damage.

At the end, Cameron tells Pepper they did not want to go to the party and Pepper, while having a breakdown, reveals that no one came to the party. To stop it, Mitchell lies by telling Pepper that Cameron still has feelings for him and then goes on a fake rampage of anger breaking items of Cameron that he hates. Pepper announces they will not have to come to his upcoming parties.

At the Pritchett house, Gloria (Sofía Vergara) gets angry at Jay (Ed O'Neill) for going golfing instead of going to church with her and Manny (Rico Rodriguez). As Jay tells them he is done with church, the earthquake occurs. Jay still goes golfing despite Gloria telling him the earthquake was a sign from God. Manny decides to go with Jay for golf instead with Gloria at the church, something that makes her mad.

At the golf course Manny asks questions about Jay's idea of hell and heaven. Jay's ideas soon worry Manny and at the end come to the conclusion that Manny is missing church because Jay is acting upon a hunch. When Gloria tells Manny of her vision of heaven he becomes even more fearful since she says that there are butterflies (which he is afraid of) in heaven.

== Production ==
"Earthquake" was written by Paul Corrigan and Brad Walsh making it their fifth writing credit for the series. The episode was directed by Michael Spiller, marking his second directing credit for the season after the season premiere, "The Old Wagon", and fifth credit overall for the series. "Earthquake" originally aired in the United States on September 30, 2010, on ABC as the third episode of the second season. This episode of Modern Family was filmed on August 3, and August 16, 2010.

Part of the plot line was revealed at a Writers Guild of America event at Paley Center in Los Angeles. On August 1, 2010, Joyce Eng of TV Guide reported that Nathan Lane would appear on Modern Family as Pepper Saltzman. He filmed his part on August 16, 2010. Lane had approached creators Christopher Lloyd and Steven Levitan if he could guest star on the series. Levitan stated in an interview with USA Today he was "the perfect fit for the part" of Pepper. Levitan also said in the same interview they would stop stunt casting actors like Nathan Lane. Lane later reprised his role multiple times, beginning with the episode "Boys' Night".

== Reception ==
=== Ratings ===
In its original American broadcast, "Earthquake" was viewed by an estimated 11.36 million households according to the Nielsen Media Research, making it the third most viewed show of the night. It received 6.8 rating/11% share among viewers and a 4.6 rating/12% share among adults between the ages of 18 and 49. It received the same rating as the previous episode, "The Kiss", but the viewership figure decreased from 11.877 million to 11.36 million. The episode also became the highest rated scripted show of the original week it aired tying with Glee's "Grilled Cheesus".

=== Reviews ===
The episode received overwhelmingly positive reviews.

Joel Keller from TV Squad wrote "that it was a great job all the way around. I'm hoping the show can keep avoiding a sophomore slump for as long as they possibly can."

Donna Bowman from The A.V. Club gave the episode a B calling it a "merely solid half-hour".

Lesley Savage of Entertainment Weekly praised the use of the characters and cast members saying "Every character had hilarious moments tonight". She also called Manny the best character saying he "stole the show"

James Poniewozik of Time called it "solid and grounded" and also commented ""Earthquake", especially in its main storyline with the Dunphys, worked because it took this basic principle and quickly, simply showed how this family reacts to sudden disorder.

Alan Sepinwall stated in his review "every now and then the show will give us a wholly satisfying, very funny episode with the three groups in isolation. "Earthquake" was one of those episodes" he also called the show "simple, effective, very funny outing."

Kara Klenc of TV Guide said "I thought there were a ton of hilarious moments in this episode"

Donald Deane of TV Squad named the episode one of the "Five Funniest TV Clips of the Week" between October 3 and 9, 2010.

=== Awards and nominations ===
Paul Corrigan and Brad Walsh received a nomination for an Episodic Comedy at the 2010 Writers Guild of America Awards facing six other programs including the Modern Family episode, "Starry Night". The episode eventually lost to 30 Rock of Robert Carlock for his work on "When It Rains, It Pours". Also, Nathan Lane was nominated for Outstanding Guest Actor in a Comedy Series at the 63rd Primetime Emmy Awards.
