= Aunt Mommy =

- Modern Family episode
- Episode no.: Season 3 Episode 15
- Directed by: Michael Spiller
- Written by: Abraham Higginbotham; Dan O'Shannon
- Production code: 3ARG15
- Original air date: February 15, 2012

Guest appearance
- Colin Hanlon as Steven

Episode chronology
← Previous "Me? Jealous?"	Next → "Virgin Territory"
- Modern Family season 3

"Aunt Mommy" is the 15th episode of the third season of the American sitcom Modern Family, and the series' 63rd episode overall. It was aired on February 15, 2012. The episode discusses the antics surrounding the surrogacy of Cam (Eric Stonestreet) and Mitch's (Jesse Tyler Ferguson) second child. There are problems surrounding the issue of which father would be the child's biological child, so Claire (Julie Bowen) offers them her egg. This would mean that both fathers share genetics with the child, but it would mean that Mitchell's child would be the child of his sister as well. Another plot line within the episode entails Manny (Rico Rodriguez) getting hurt while Jay (Ed O'Neill) was trying to convince him to play football because he thinks his son is too similar to his mother. Overall, the episode received positive reviews, but was not viewed by as many people compared to the previous episode. The episode was written by Abraham Higginbotham & Dan O'Shannon and directed by Michael Spiller.

== Plot ==
Two of Cam (Eric Stonestreet) and Mitch's (Jesse Tyler Ferguson) friends, Steven (Colin Hanlon) and Stefan (Rodrigo Rojas), want to buy a new house and they ask their help so they can bring them in contact with Phil (Ty Burrell). The couple has recently had a son via a surrogate mother and that is the main reason they want to buy a new house. The deal is done and Phil and Claire (Julie Bowen) want to take Cam and Mitch out for dinner as a way to thank them.

At the dinner, Cam feels depressed because the process of their attempt to adopt a second baby is taking too long and the solution of surrogacy does not sound good because one of them would be left out since only one could be the biological father. All four of them are drinking while they are discussing and Claire ends up offering her egg to them so they can have a half-Pritchett and half-Tucker baby. Everyone seems ecstatic with her offer until next morning when they realized what they agreed to.

Mitch tells Cam that they can't accept Claire's offer because it will be weird to have his sister's kid. Phil also tells Claire that they can not do that and Claire agrees with him but none of the four knows how to tell each other that they changed their minds.

Meanwhile, Jay (Ed O'Neill) thinks that Manny (Rico Rodriguez) spends too much time with his mother Gloria (Sofía Vergara) and he tries to make him do more "guy" things and activities, like playing football instead of going to the theater or collecting lucky pennies. He tells Gloria that his friend did not find tickets for a theater play Manny wanted to go so he can take him to play football. Manny is injured at the football practice because he stops to pick up a penny. Gloria blames Jay for Manny's injury, especially after she finds out that his friend did find tickets for the play and Jay cancelled them so Manny can go to the football practice.

At the end of the episode, the whole family gathers at Jay and Gloria's house where Claire, Phil, Cam and Mitch try to tell each other about the surrogate issue. Haley (Sarah Hyland), Alex (Ariel Winter) and Luke (Nolan Gould) hear their parents talking about it and they believe that what their mother offered to do is great. Mitch and Cam hear them and believe that Claire and Phil already told them about it because they really want to help them.

Mitch and Cam ask for Jay's opinion about it and Jay says that it is not right to do something like that. Soon, everyone starts saying their opinion and Mitch and Claire get under the table to discuss alone in peace about what they should do. They end up saying that they should not do it even though they love each other very much.

== Reception ==
=== Ratings ===
In its original American broadcast, "Aunt Mommy" was watched by 11.23 million; down 1.67 million from the previous episode.

=== Reviews ===
"Aunt Mommy" received positive reviews.

Meredith Blake from The A.V. Club gave a B+ to the episode stating: "Tonight’s Modern Family isn’t the funniest episode of the series—or the season, for that matter—but it’s a standout for two closely related reasons that have little to do with its zingers-per-minute rate."

Leigh Raines of TV Fanatic rated the episode with 4.5/5.

Christine N. Ziemba from Paste Magazine gave the episode an 8.5/10. "This week’s Modern Family focused on the issue of surrogate mothers vs. adoption for gay parents. Thankfully, the episode didn’t fall into the trappings of A Very Special Blossom… or an after-school special. It dealt with the issues in a very adult manner: by downing lots of alcohol. [...] We also enjoyed how they tackled a serious subject with humor—and managed to throw political correctness to the wind quite a few times. We’d like to see more of that, please."

Shayelizatrotter of The Comedy Critic gave an A+ to the episode saying that Modern Family made an "impressive comeback" after last week's "forgettable episode". "Overall, a fantastic episode with a number of hilarious, quotable scenes!"

JeffEightyOne of Ape Donkey said that this was a "solid rebound episode". "One of the things I think Modern Family does well is even though each episode has to find a way to establish various storylines pretty efficiently and then follow through with them, they still find a way to include plenty of good throwaway lines/moments. The first 5 minutes of “Aunt Mommy” demonstrated this quite well."
