= Halloween (Modern Family) =

- Modern Family episode
- Mitchell (Jesse Tyler Ferguson) trying to take off the Spider-Man costume he wore at work
- Episode no.: Season 2 Episode 6
- Directed by: Michael Spiller
- Written by: Jeffrey Richman
- Production code: 2ARG09
- Original air date: October 27, 2010

Guest appearances
- Justin Kirk as Charlie Bingham; Matt Besser as Jerry; Amir Talai as Dale

Episode chronology
| ← Previous "Unplugged" | Next → "Chirp" |
- Modern Family season 2

"Halloween" is the sixth episode of Modern Family's second season and 30th episode overall. It was originally broadcast on October 27, 2010, on the ABC network in the United States. The episode was written by Jeffrey Richman and directed by Michael Spiller and was based on an idea by cast member Eric Stonestreet.

The episode follows Claire's love for Halloween, which leads her to transform the Dunphy residence into a haunted house for trick-or-treaters. Cameron cannot shake a childhood trauma related to the holiday and Mitchell has a terrible day at work. Gloria acts weird after Jay and Manny tease her about her accent.

"Halloween" received mostly positive reviews from critics. According to Nielsen Media Research, "Halloween" became the most viewed episode of the series and tied for the series' highest-rated episode among adults between ages 18 and 49. It later became the second highest-rated show for the week as well as the week's highest-rated scripted program.

This episode received multiple Primetime Emmy Award nominations at the 63rd Primetime Emmy Awards, and won for Outstanding Directing for a Comedy Series for Michael Spiller. Jesse Tyler Ferguson was nominated for Outstanding Supporting Actor in a Comedy Series for his performance in this episode.

== Plot ==
At the Dunphy house, Phil (Ty Burrell) learns that his neighbor, Jerry (Matt Besser) has divorced. Phil is initially sad for Jerry, but soon fears that the same thing might happen to him and his wife, Claire (Julie Bowen). Phil soon assumes Claire's concentration on completing the haunted house is a sign that she no longer loves him. He soon does the opposite of what Jerry did that caused the demise of his marriage, like being spontaneous, with all of Phil's attempts failing.

Mitchell (Jesse Tyler Ferguson) also gets excited when he learns that his new law firm allows employees to wear Halloween costumes, and decides to wear a Spider-Man costume to work. Unfortunately, he learns too late that "only tools and douches wear costumes". He quickly puts on a suit over the costume, thinking that he can change out of the costume later, but he is pulled into several meetings and is unable to get the chance to take it off.

Meanwhile, Gloria (Sofía Vergara) gets offended by Manny (Rico Rodriguez) and Jay (Ed O'Neill) correcting her accent so she starts acting weird and talking differently.

At Claire's finished haunted house, everything goes wrong with Jay late at activating the effects, Gloria speaking in her "English" voice, Alex poorly imitating being held prisoner and Cameron still talking about his "traumatic" Halloween story. After two failed attempts at scaring trick-or-treaters, Claire and Gloria both become furious and walk out of the haunted house. Jay reveals to Gloria that it was the sound of her accented voice that made him fall in love with her on the day he met her, which reassures her. Phil asks Claire if she is tired of him, to which she responds that they are happily stuck together as a couple. While they talk, the rest of the family finishes the haunted house perfectly, to Claire and Phil's happiness.

== Production ==
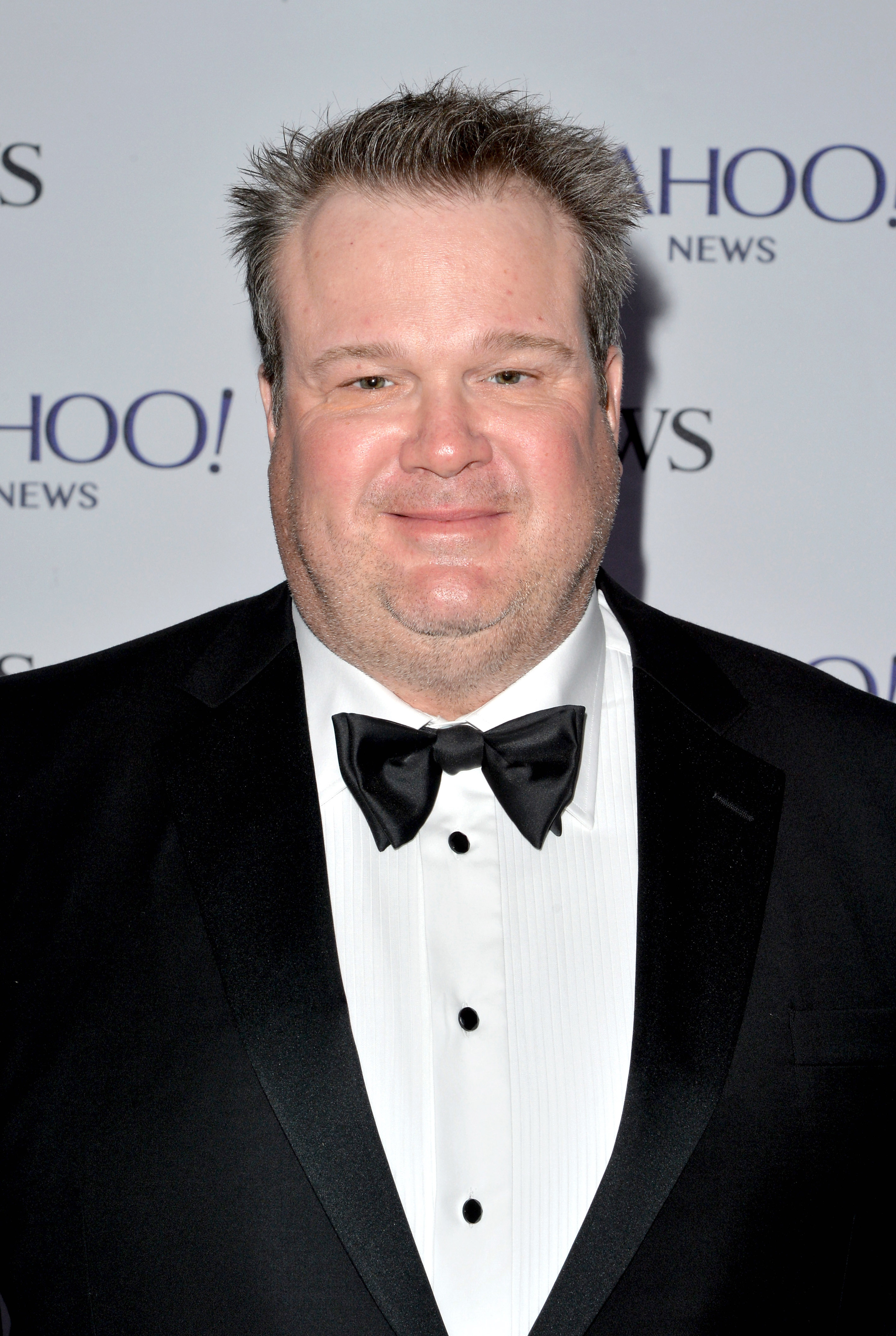
Eric Stonestreet, who portrays Cameron Tucker on the show, pitched the idea for a Halloween themed episode.

"Halloween" was directed by Michael Spiller and was the first episode Jeffrey Richman wrote for the series since joining the writing staff at the beginning of the second season.

"Halloween" aired on October 27, 2010 as the first Halloween-themed episode and the 30th episode overall for the series. Parts of the episode were filmed on October 6, 2010, and October 8, 2010. The idea for the episode was pitched by cast member Eric Stonestreet who suggested that there should be a Modern Family episode about Halloween. The series' producers liked the idea so much that they produced "Halloween". Many of the cast members costumes were revealed on the first day of filming by script coordinator Clint McCray through Twitter. Ferguson later said in an interview that:

"The Spider-Man scene from the Halloween episode was my favorite to shoot thus far for the sheer fact that I was scaling down a wall in a Spider-Man costume. I will never in my life be cast in a movie where I am able to wear a super-hero costume and perform my own stunts. It was like I got to live a dream for a day."

== Reception ==
=== Ratings ===
In its original American broadcast, "Halloween" was viewed by an estimated 13.143 million households and received a Nielsen rating of 7.8 rating/12% share, meaning that 7.8% of American households watched the episode and that 12% of all televisions in use at the time were watching it. The episode also received a 5.1 rating/14% share among adults between ages 18 and 49. The episode marked a nine percent rise in the 18-49 demographic from the previous episode, "Unplugged", becoming the most viewed episode of the series in total viewers and the highest-rated episode in the 18-49 demographic, tying with "The Old Wagon". The episode also became the highest-rated scripted program and the second highest-rated program overall for the week it premiered among adults between the ages of 18 and 49. Added with the DVR viewers, the episode received a 6.6 rating in the 18-49 demographic, adding a 1.4 rating to the original viewership.

=== Reviews ===
The episode received mostly positive reviews.

Donna Bowman from The A.V. Club compared "Halloween" to the highly praised episode "Fizbo", saying ""Halloween" reminded me very much of season one’s 'Fizbo', especially in the chaotic climax where everyone contributes their particular insecurity or neurosis." The A.V. Club later named it, along with "Fifteen Percent" and "Truth Be Told", the best 2010 episodes of Modern Family.

James Poniewozik of Time gave the episode a positive review calling it "fine", but not his "favorite". He named Gloria's storyline his favorite, saying "Sofia Vergara's exaggerated, passive-aggressive American accent was brilliant".

Joel Keller of TV Squad praised the development of Claire, and felt that her "losing it" helped "soften her character."

Joye Eng of TV Guide named Gloria's storyline the best moment of the week the episode premiered. She named Gloria's "reaction shot when he inevitably unwraps a package of tiny Jesus figurines" and "Sofia Vergara's version of a typical American accent" the most "fun". Kara Klenc of the same website called it a "great episode". It was later named it the eleventh best television episode of 2010 by the website.

On the other hand, Michael Slezak of Entertainment Weekly gave the episode a negative review. He wrote: "The unimaginatively titled "Halloween" was probably the least hilarious installment to date of Modern Family's second season". He also criticized the ending to Cameron's story, saying "while I expected the big reveal would leave me howling, when it finally came ('I wet my pants!'), I didn't even crack a smile."

=== Awards and nominations ===
"Halloween" received several Primetime Emmy Award nominations. The episode was nominated for Outstanding Art Direction for a Single-Camera Series, Outstanding Picture Single-Camera Picture Editing for a Comedy Series, and Outstanding Sound Mixing for a Comedy or Drama Series (Half-Hour) and Animation. The episode eventually won for Outstanding Directing for a Comedy Series for Michael Spiller.

Ferguson, who submitted this episode, was nominated for Outstanding Supporting Actor in a Comedy Series, but lost to co-star Burrell.
