= Michael Spiller =

American cinematographer and television director

- Born: August 1, 1961 (age 65); New Jersey, U.S.
- Education: Purchase College
- Occupations: Cinematographer, television director
- Years active: 1984–present

Michael Alan Spiller (born August 1, 1961) is an American cinematographer and television director.

Spiller has directed on numerous series and has also served as a cinematographer before directing. Early, he worked frequently with director and classmate Hal Hartley, including cinematography for Hartley's breakout film The Unbelievable Truth, which helped launch both of their careers. He was a regular director on the series Sex and the City where he also served as director of photography during the first four seasons. After Sex and the City, Spiller directed episodes on series such as Scrubs, Jake in Progress, The Bernie Mac Show and Big Love. Spiller was also a producer on the series Jake in Progress and Big Day.

In 2011, he won a Primetime Emmy Award for Outstanding Directing for a Comedy Series for the Modern Family episode "Halloween".

Spiller was born in New Jersey and raised in Brooklyn, New York.

== Director filmography ==
=== TV series ===
- So Help Me Todd (2022)
  - episode 1.02 "Co-Pilot"
- Firefly Lane (2022)
  - episode 1.01 "Wish You Were Here"
  - episode 1.02 "On the Road"
- The Mighty Ducks: Game Changers (2021)
  - episode 1.02 "Dusters"
  - episode 1.08 "Change on the Fly"
  - episode 1.10 "State of Play"
- Perfect Harmony (2020)
  - episode 1.12 "Hymn-a-Thon"
- AJ and the Queen (2020)
  - episode 1.08 "Baton Rouge"
- Mixed-ish (2019-2022)
  - episode 1.03 "Let Your Hair Down"
  - episode 1.14 "True Colors"
  - episode 1.15 "This Charming Man"
- Good Girls (2019)
  - episode 2.15 "Everything Must Go"
- Whiskey Cavalier (2019)
  - episode 1.06 "Five Spies and a Baby"
- I Feel Bad (2018)
  - episode 1.10 "My Kids Barely Know Their Cultures"
- Fresh Off the Boat (2018)
  - episode 5.02 "The Hand That Sits The Cradle"
- Champions (2018)
  - episode 1.01 "Pilot"
  - episode 1.02 "I Think I'm Gonna Tolerate It Here"
  - episode 1.06 "Grandma Dearest"
  - episode 1.08 "Nepotism"
- Superstore (2017-2018)
  - episode 2.14 "Super Hot Store"
  - episode 3.11 "Angels and Mermaids"
- Black-ish (2016-2022)
  - episode 2.15 "Twindependice"
  - episode 3.18 "Manitery"
  - episode 4.10 "Working Girl"
  - episode 6.05 "Mad and Boujee"
  - episode 7.17 "Move-In Ready"
- Brooklyn Nine-Nine (2016)
  - episode 3.13 "The Cruise"
- The Mindy Project (2012-2017)
  - episode 1.02 "Hiring and Firing"
  - episode 1.03 "In The Club"
  - episode 1.06 "Thanksgiving"
  - episode 1.10 "Mindy's Brother"
  - episode 1.13 "Harry & Sally"
  - episode 1.16 "The One That Got Away"
  - episode 1.19 "My Cool Christian Boyfriend"
  - episode 1.24 "Take Me With You"
  - episode 2.1 "All My Problems Forever"
  - episode 2.2 "The Other Dr. L"
  - episode 2.11 "Christmas Party Sex Trip"
  - episode 2.13 "L.A."
  - episode 2.16 "Indian BBW"
  - episode 2.22 "Danny and Mindy"
  - episode 3.1 "We're a Couple Now, Haters!"
  - episode 3.5 "The Devil Wears Lands' End"
  - episode 3.12 "Stanford"
  - episode 3.13 "San Francisco Bae"
  - episode 3.21 "Best Man"
  - episode 4.1 "While I Was Sleeping"
  - episode 4.13 "When Mindy Met Dandy"
  - episode 4.12 "Will They or Won't They"
  - episode 4.26 "Homewrecker"
  - episode 5.1 "Decision 2016"
  - episode 5.7 "Concord"
  - episode 5.8 "Revenge of the Nurse"
  - episode 5.11 "Dibs"
  - episode 5.14 "A Decent Prosopal"
  - episode 6.9 "Danny In Real Life"
  - episode 6.10 "It Had To Be You"
- New Girl (2012)
  - episode 1.22 "Tomatoes"
  - episode 1.24 "See Ya"
- Don't Trust the B— in Apartment 23 (2012)
  - episode 1.02 "Daddy's Girl..."
- Modern Family (2010–2019)
  - episode 1.11 "Up All Night"
  - episode 1.15 "My Funky Valentine"
  - episode 2.01 "The Old Wagon"
  - episode 2.03 "Earthquake"
  - episode 2.05 "Unplugged"
  - episode 2.06 "Halloween"
  - episode 2.07 "Chirp"
  - episode 2.08 "Manny Get Your Gun"
  - episode 2.09 "Mother Tucker"
  - episode 2.13 "Caught in the Act"
  - episode 2.15 "Princess Party"
  - episode 2.19 "The Musical Man"
  - episode 2.20 "Someone to Watch Over Lily"
  - episode 2.21 "Mother's Day"
  - episode 3.02 "When Good Kids Go Bad"
  - episode 3.09 "Punkin Chunkin"
  - episode 3.10 "Express Christmas"
  - episode 3.14 "Me? Jealous?"
  - episode 3.15 "Aunt Mommy"
  - episode 3.20 "The Last Walt"
  - episode 11.03 "Snapped"
- Cougar Town (2009)
  - episode 1.4 "I Won't Back Down"
- Samantha Who? (2007)
  - episode "The Wedding"
  - episode "The Hypnotherapist"
- Ugly Betty (2006)
  - episode "In or Out"
- Big Love (2006)
  - episode "Eclipse"
  - episode "Eviction"
- Jake in Progress (2005)
- Kitchen Confidential (2005)
  - episode 1.03 "Dinner Date with Death"
- Life As We Know It (2004)
- Method & Red (2004)
- Cracking Up (2004)
- Lucky (2003)
  - episode 1.7 "Savant"
  - episode 1.13 "In the Stars"
- Oliver Beene (2003)
- Do Over (2002)
  - episode "Valentine's Day Dance"
- Monk (2002)
  - episode 2.03 "Mr. Monk Goes to the Ballgame"
- Greg the Bunny (2002)
  - episode 1.04 "Greg Gets Puppish
- Leap of Faith (2002)
- The Bernie Mac Show (2001)
- Scrubs (2001-2006; 2009-2010; 2026)
  - episode 1.13 "My Balancing Act"
  - episode 1.14 "My Drug Buddy"
  - episode 1.23 "My Hero"
  - episode 1.24 "My Last Day"
  - episode 2.03 "My Case Study"
  - episode 2.06 "My Big Brother"
  - episode 2.14 "My Brother, My Keeper"
  - episode 2.19 "My Kingdom"
  - episode 2.21 "My Drama Queen"
  - episode 3.02 "My Journey"
  - episode 3.03 "My White Whale"
  - episode 3.12 "My Catalyst"
  - episode 4.21 "My Quarantine"
  - episode 5.03 "My Day at the Races"
  - episode 5.16 "My Bright Idea
  - episode 8.02 "My Jerks"
  - episode 8.04 "My Saving Grace"
  - episode 9.01 "Our First Day of School"
  - episode 9.05 "Our Mysteries"
  - episode 9.10 "Our True Lies"
  - episode 10.02 "My 2nd First Day"
- Sex and the City (1999-2001)
  - episode 2.13 "Games People Play"
  - episode 3.15 "Hot Child in the City"
  - episode 3.16 "Frenemies"
  - episode 4.05 "Ghost Town"
  - episode 4.06 "Baby, Talk Is Cheap"
  - episode 4.09 "Sex and the Country"
  - episode 4.10 "Belles of the Ball"
