= The Old Wagon =

- Modern Family episode
- Mitchell (Jesse Tyler Ferguson) trapped inside Lily's Princess Castle
- Episode no.: Season 2 Episode 1
- Directed by: Michael Spiller
- Written by: Bill Wrubel
- Production code: 2ARG05
- Original air date: September 22, 2010

Guest appearance
- Callie Thompson as Kelly

Episode chronology
| ← Previous "Family Portrait" | Next → "The Kiss" |
- Modern Family season 2

"The Old Wagon" is the second-season premiere of the American sitcom Modern Family and the 25th episode overall. It was aired on September 22, 2010. The episode was written by Bill Wrubel and was directed by Michael Spiller. The episode is also Wrubel's first credit as co-executive producer.

In the episode, Phil finally agrees to sell the family's old station wagon but before doing it, he and the whole family goes for a trip down memory lane to say goodbye to it. Cameron asks Jay for help when Mitchell decides to build a life-size princess castle for Lily even though he is not very handy with the tools. Meanwhile, Gloria deals with the possibility of losing Manny to his girlfriend.

"The Old Wagon" received positive reviews from critics, with Samantha Zalaznick of The Huffington Post naming the Dunphy's and Phil the best part of the episode. "The Old Wagon" also became the highest-rated sitcom of the week and for the series among adults between the ages of 18 and 49.

== Plot ==
In the Dunphy's house, Claire (Julie Bowen) gets Phil (Ty Burrell) to agree to sell their old station wagon. While looking through the stuff in the car and going through several mementos, Claire starts crying and decides she want to keep it, but will be unable to as the car already has a buyer. Due to this, Phil decides to take the family on one last ride in the car "down memory lane" and they take the car to a hill where the family used to drive to in the past. While on a hill, eating, Claire thanks Phil for a good time. Chaos ensues when Luke's stomach ache and Claire tells him it will be fine. Haley finds a spider and steps on Phil's seatbelt. Luke needs air and Claire asks Alex to open her window, but it gets stuck. Haley sees the spider again. Phil decides to put on the A/C, but puts on the heater and dust come out. Claire tells Luke to vomit in a bag, but complains it smells like onions. Alex's seatbelt is stuck and Claire decides to unhook it, but accidentally spills her milkshake. Haley sees the spider again and steps on the seatbelt, which causes Phil to spit his milkshake. Luke is about to vomit and the parents get out of the car. While Luke is vomiting, the car begins to roll down the hill. Phil gets on the hood, trying not to let go, but Claire tells to let go and the car gets destroyed.

Despite this, the family had a good time.

Meanwhile, Mitchell (Jesse Tyler Ferguson) decides to build a life-size princess castle for Lily, but Cameron (Eric Stonestreet) is scared due to Mitchell's horrible past with equipment. Cameron decides to call Jay (Ed O'Neill) in for reinforcement, and the two try to get Mitchell to do meaningless jobs. Mitchell catches on and leaves the project. While Jay and Cameron get drinks, Mitchell puts the roof on the castle and gets stuck inside the castle. He is forced to ask Cameron and Jay to let him out, and he eventually gives up on trying to be a manly man.

Manny (Rico Rodriguez) invites a cute girl, Kelly (Callie Thompson), over for a study date who eventually starts to change Manny, making Gloria (Sofía Vergara) a little uncomfortable and jealous. Eventually, Gloria decides to let him go with his girlfriend to the movies, but he soon comes back after breaking up with her, making Gloria even happier, before Manny makes another date with another girl. This Angers Gloria, declaring all men are the same and calls them animals.

== Production and themes ==
"The Old Wagon" was written by Bill Wrubel his fifth writing credit for the series. The episode was also his first episode as co-executive producer. The episode was directed by Michael Spiller, his third credit for the series.

The episode is the first of Modern Family's second season after ABC Entertainment President Stephen McPherson announced that Modern Family had been renewed for a second season. Despite this, it was not the first episode of the season filmed. Steven Levitan said on Twitter that it was difficult for him and ABC to decide which episode should air as the season premiere, although they eventually decided upon "The Old Wagon".

The episode premiered on September 22, 2010, in the 9:00pm timeslot before Cougar Town and after the now-cancelled Better with You and later aired a rerun on September 24 at the 8:00pm timeslot.

The episode's main theme deals with "accepting change". In his review, James Poniewozik wrote that the episode's main message was to show that "it can be sad when things change and we get older". Samantha Zalaznick of The Huffington Post wrote that the episode aligned with the second season's main theme that "the kids are growing up". During the episode, Cameron says he is tired of reading "The Very Hungry Caterpillar".

== Reception ==
=== Ratings ===
In its original American broadcast, "The Old Wagon" was viewed by an estimated 12.61 million households. The episode also received a 5.1 rating/14% share in the 18–34 demographic. This means that it was seen by 5.1% of all 18- to 34-year-olds, and 14% of all 18- to 34-year-olds watching television at the time of the broadcast. The episode marked 19 percent increase from the series premiere, "Pilot". The episode also beat the closest competition by 28 percent. The show also become the highest-rated comedy of the week between the broadcast networks. The show was also the fifth highest-rated show in the 18–34 demographic and eighteenth in total viewers. The episode was also the fourth most DVR'd show of the week with 2.7 million viewers in the demographic making a total of 15.46 million viewers and received a 6.4 rating marking a 25 percent rise from the original viewership.

=== Reviews ===
The episode received mostly positive reviews.

Joel Keller of TV Squad gave the episode a positive review and also stated "the sequence of mishaps in the car as they overlook the city reminds viewers how this show excels at physical comedy". He also complemented the series for not featuring a big guest star for the season premiere writing that it is "always the sign of a quality show".

The A.V. Club reviewer Donna Bowman, praised the sequence of mishaps in the Dunphy's car stating "That’s all I need to be confident that season two could be as good as the show’s critical reputation would have us believe" despite being worried it would go through a sophomore slump. She ultimately gave the episode an A− while readers gave the episode a B.

Samantha Zalaznick of The Huffington Post named Phil the best character of the episode and also stated "The Dunphys were definitely the highlight of this episode".

Lesley Savage of Entertainment Weekly praised the episode for its character development. She also praised the subtle humor of the episode, particularly the scene featuring Cameron reading a tabloid magazine to Lily.

James Poniewozik of Time called it a "relief" to watch the episode after multiple negative reviews of other fall shows. Despite this, he criticized the last minute of the episode saying "It's not necessary under any circumstances, but least of all when the episode's theme was already as subtle as a dangerously wielded power tool."

Matt Roush called it a "wonderful season opener".

Not all reviews were positive. HitFix reviewer Alan Sepinwall, was mixed towards the episode and criticized it for being a " refresher course on who these people are and what the show is". Despite this, he said the episode was still funny and called it a great episode for Sofia Vergara. Several comments on a Los Angeles Times forum, gave the episode a mixed review comments ranging from "Great" to "disappointing".
