= 63rd Primetime Creative Arts Emmy Awards =

2011 American television programming awards

- Date: September 10, 2011
- Location: Nokia Theatre; Los Angeles, California
- Presented by: Academy of Television Arts & Sciences
- Most awards: Boardwalk Empire (7)

Television/radio coverage
- Network: ReelzChannel

The 63rd Annual Primetime Creative Arts Emmy Awards ceremony was held on September 10, 2011 at the Nokia Theatre in Downtown Los Angeles. This is in conjunction with the annual Primetime Emmy Awards and is presented in recognition of technical and other similar achievements in American television programming.

== Winners and nominees ==
Winners are listed first and highlighted in bold:

=== Governor's Award ===
- **John Walsh**

=== Programs ===
Programs
| **Outstanding Reality Program**: **Deadliest Catch (Discovery Channel)**; Antiques Roadshow (PBS); Hoarders (A&E); Kathy Griffin: My Life on the D-List (Bravo); MythBusters (Discovery Channel); Undercover Boss (CBS) | **Outstanding Variety, Music, or Comedy Special**: **The Kennedy Center Honors (CBS)**; Bette Midler: The Showgirl Must Go On (HBO); Carrie Fisher in Wishful Drinking (HBO); Lady Gaga Presents the Monster Ball Tour: At Madison Square Garden (HBO); The Pee-Wee Herman Show on Broadway (HBO) |
| **Outstanding Nonfiction Series**: **American Masters (PBS)**; 30 for 30 (ESPN); Anthony Bourdain: No Reservations (Travel Channel); Biography (Bio); Moguls and Movie Stars (TCM); Pioneers of Television (PBS) | **Outstanding Nonfiction Special**: **Gettysburg (History)**; Becoming Chaz (OWN); His Way (HBO); Jaws: The Inside Story (Bio); Stand Up to Cancer (ABC / CBS / NBC) |
| **Outstanding Animated Program**: **Futurama: "The Late Philip J. Fry" (Comedy Central)**; The Cleveland Show: "Murray Christmas" (Fox); Robot Chicken: "Star Wars Episode III" (Adult Swim); The Simpsons: "Angry Dad: The Movie" (Fox); South Park: "Crack Baby Athletic Association" (Comedy Central) | **Outstanding Short-Format Animated Program**: **Prep & Landing: Operation: Secret Santa (ABC)**; Adventure Time: "It Came from the Nightosphere" (Cartoon Network); Regular Show: "Mordecai and the Rigbys" (Cartoon Network); Robot Chicken: "Robot Chicken's DP Christmas Special" (Adult Swim); SpongeBob SquarePants: "That Sinking Feeling" (Nickelodeon) |
| **Outstanding Children's Program**: **A Child's Garden of Poetry (HBO)**; Degrassi (TeenNick); iCarly (Nickelodeon); Victorious (Nickelodeon); Wizards of Waverly Place (Disney Channel) | **Outstanding Children's Nonfiction, Reality, or Reality-Competition Program**: **Nick News with Linda Ellerbee: Under the Influence: Kids of Alcoholics (Nickelodeon)**; Masterclass (HBO) |
| **Outstanding Special Class Program**: **64th Tony Awards (CBS)**; 53rd Grammy Awards (CBS); 68th Golden Globe Awards (NBC); 83rd Academy Awards (ABC) | **Outstanding Short-Format Live-Action Entertainment Program**: **The Daily Show Correspondents Explain (thedailyshow.com)**; 30 Rock: The Webisodes (NBC.com) |
| **Outstanding Special Class – Short-Format Nonfiction Program**: **Jay Leno's Garage (jaylenosgarage.com)**; Writer's Draft (Fox Movie Channel) | **Exceptional Merit in Nonfiction Filmmaking**: **Freedom Riders (PBS)**; Gasland (HBO); The Most Dangerous Man in America: Daniel Ellsberg and the Pentagon Papers (PBS) |

=== Acting ===
Acting
| **Outstanding Guest Actor in a Drama Series**: **Paul McCrane** as Josh Peyton on Harry's Law (Episode: "With Friends Like These") (NBC); Beau Bridges as Nick Brody on Brothers & Sisters (Episode: "Brody") (ABC); Bruce Dern as Frank Harlow on Big Love (Episode: "D.I.V.O.R.C.E.") (HBO); Jeremy Davies as Dickie Bennett on Justified (Episode: "Reckoning") (FX); Michael J. Fox as Louis Canning on The Good Wife (Episode: "Real Deal") (CBS); Robert Morse as Bert Cooper on Mad Men (Episode: "Blowing Smoke") (AMC) | **Outstanding Guest Actress in a Drama Series**: **Loretta Devine** as Adele Webber on Grey's Anatomy (Episode: "This is How We Do It") (ABC); Cara Buono as Dr. Faye Miller on Mad Men (Episode: "Chinese Wall") (AMC); Joan Cusack as Sheila Jackson on Shameless (Episode: "Frank Gallagher: Loving Husband, Devoted Father") (Showtime); Randee Heller as Ida Blankenship on Mad Men (Episode: "The Beautiful Girls") (AMC); Mary McDonnell as Capt. Sharon Raydor on The Closer (Episode: "Help Wanted") (TNT); Julia Stiles as Lumen Pierce on Dexter (Episode: "In the Beginning") (Showtime); Alfre Woodard as Ruby Jean Reynolds on True Blood (Episode: "Night on the Sun") (HBO) |
| **Outstanding Guest Actor in a Comedy Series**: **Justin Timberlake as Various Characters on Saturday Night Live (Episode: "Host: Justin Timberlake") (NBC)**; Will Arnett as Devin Banks on 30 Rock (Episode: "Plan B") (NBC); Matt Damon as Carol Burnett on 30 Rock (Episode: "Double-Edged Sword") (NBC); Idris Elba as Lenny on The Big C (Episode: "Blue-Eyed Iris") (Showtime); Zach Galifianakis as Various Characters on Saturday Night Live (Episode: "Host: Zach Galifianakis") (NBC); Nathan Lane as Pepper Saltzman on Modern Family (Episode: "Boys' Night") (ABC) | **Outstanding Guest Actress in a Comedy Series**: **Gwyneth Paltrow as Holly Holliday on Glee (Episode: "The Substitute") (Fox)**; Elizabeth Banks as Avery Jessup on 30 Rock (Episode: "Double-Edged Sword") (NBC); Kristin Chenoweth as April Rhodes on Glee (Episode: "Rumours") (Fox); Tina Fey as Various Characters on Saturday Night Live (Episode: "Host: Tina Fey") (NBC); Dot-Marie Jones as Coach Beiste on Glee (Episode: "Never Been Kissed") (Fox); Cloris Leachman as Maw Maw on Raising Hope (Episode: "Don't Vote for this Episode") (Fox) |
**Outstanding Voice-Over Performance**: **Maurice LaMarche as Lrrr and Orson Welles on Futurama (Episode: "Lrrreconcilable Ndndifferences") (Comedy Central)**; Bob Bergen as Porky Pig on The Looney Tunes Show (Episode: "Jailbird and Jailbunny") (Cartoon Network); Dan Castellaneta as Homer Simpson, Krusty the Clown, Barney Gumble, and Louie on The Simpsons (Episode: "Donnie Fatso") (Fox); Seth Green as Various Characters on Robot Chicken (Episode: "Catch Me If You Kangaroo Jack") (Adult Swim); Christopher Plummer as Narrator on Moguls and Movie Stars (Episode: "The Birth of Hollywood") (TCM); Brenda Strong as Mary Alice Young on Desperate Housewives (Episode: "Come on Over for Dinner") (ABC)

=== Art Direction ===
Art Direction
| **Outstanding Art Direction for a Multi-Camera Series**: **Hot in Cleveland (Episodes: "Sisterhood of the Traveling SPANX", "I Love Lucci: Part Two", "LeBron Is Le Gone") (TV Land)**; The Big Bang Theory (Episodes: "The Love Car Displacement", "The 21-Second Excitation", "The Agreement Dissection") (CBS); How I Met Your Mother (Episodes: "Subway Wars", "Natural History") (CBS); Mike & Molly (Episode: "Pilot") (CBS); Rules of Engagement (Episodes: "Last of the Red Hat Lovers", "Singing and Dancing", "The Set Up") (CBS) | **Outstanding Art Direction for a Single-Camera Series**: **Boardwalk Empire (Episode: "Boardwalk Empire") (HBO)**; The Borgias (Episode: "Lucrezia's Wedding") (Showtime); Mad Men (Episode: "Public Relations") (AMC); Modern Family (Episode: "Halloween") (ABC); True Blood (Episode: "Beautifully Broken") (HBO) |
| **Outstanding Art Direction for a Miniseries or Movie**: **Mildred Pierce (HBO)**; Downton Abbey (PBS); The Kennedys (ReelzChannel); Upstairs Downstairs (PBS) | **Outstanding Art Direction for Variety or Nonfiction Programming**: **2010 MTV Video Music Awards (MTV)**; 83rd Academy Awards (ABC); American Idol (Episode: "Episode 1018") (Fox); Gettysburg (History); Saturday Night Live (Episode: "Host: Russell Brand") (NBC) |

=== Casting ===
Casting
| **Outstanding Casting for a Comedy Series**: **Glee – Robert J. Ulrich and Eric Dawson (Fox)**; 30 Rock – Jennifer McNamara Shroff and Katja Blichfeld (NBC); The Big C – Julie Tucker and Ross Meyerson (Showtime); Modern Family – Jeff Greenberg (ABC); Nurse Jackie – Julie Tucker and Ross Meyerson (Showtime) | **Outstanding Casting for a Drama Series**: **Boardwalk Empire – Ellen Lewis and Meredith Tucker (HBO)**; Game of Thrones – Nina Gold and Robert Sterne (HBO); The Good Wife – Mark Saks (CBS); The Killing – Junie Lowry-Johnson, Libby Goldstein, Stuart Aikins, Corrine Clark and Jennifer Page (AMC); Mad Men – Laura Schiff and Carrie Audino (AMC) |
**Outstanding Casting for a Miniseries, Movie, or Special**: **Mildred Pierce – Laura Rosenthal (HBO)**; Cinema Verite – Randi Hiller (HBO); Downton Abbey – Jill Trevellick (PBS); Too Big to Fail – Alexa L. Fogel and Christine Kromer (HBO); Upstairs Downstairs – Andy Pryor (PBS)

=== Choreography ===
Programs
**Outstanding Choreography**
- **Tabitha and Napoleon D'umo – So You Think You Can Dance (Routines: "Scars", "Fallin", "Outta Your Mind") (Fox) (TIE)**
- **Mia Michaels – So You Think You Can Dance (Routines: "Alice in Mia-Land 'Every Little Thing She Does is Magic'", "When We Dance", "This Bitter Earth – On the Nature of Daylight") (Fox) (TIE)**
  - Mark Ballas – Dancing with the Stars (Routines: "Jive I Write Sins Not Tragedies", "Viennese Waltz 'Hedwigs Theme (Theme from Harry Potter)'", "Slow Waltz 'My Love'") (ABC)
  - Stacey Tookey – So You Think You Can Dance (Routines: "Mad World", "Sundrenched World", "Heaven is a Place on Earth") (Fox)
  - Travis Wall – So You Think You Can Dance (Routines: "Collide", "How it Ends", "Fix You") (Fox)

=== Cinematography ===
Cinematography
| **Outstanding Cinematography for a Multi-Camera Series**: **Two and a Half Men (Episode: "Hookers, Hookers, Hookers") (CBS)**; How I Met Your Mother (Episode: "Hopeless") (CBS); Pair of Kings (Episode: "Return of the Kings") (Disney Channel); Retired at 35 (Episode: "Rocket Man") (TV Land); Rules of Engagement (Episode: "Uh Oh, It's Magic") (CBS); Wizards of Waverly Place (Episode: "Dancing with Angels") (Disney Channel) | **Outstanding Cinematography for a Single-Camera Series**: **Boardwalk Empire (Episode: "Home") (HBO)**; Boardwalk Empire (Episode: "Boardwalk Empire") (HBO); Boardwalk Empire (Episode: "A Return to Normalcy") (HBO); The Borgias (Episodes: "The Poisoned Chalice" / "The Assassin") (Showtime); The Good Wife (Episode: "Double Jeopardy") (CBS) |
| **Outstanding Cinematography for a Miniseries or Movie**: **Downton Abbey (Episode: "Part One") (PBS)**; The Kennedys (Episode: "Life Sentences") (ReelzChannel); Mildred Pierce (Episode: "Part Five") (HBO); The Pillars of the Earth (Episode: "Legacy") (HBO); Too Big to Fail (HBO) | **Outstanding Cinematography for Nonfiction Programming**: **Anthony Bourdain: No Reservations (Episode: "Haiti") (Travel Channel)**; American Masters (Episode: "Troubadours: Carole King / James Taylor and the Rise of the Singer-Songwriter") (PBS); Gasland (HBO); Gettysburg (History); If God Is Willing and da Creek Don't Rise (HBO); Whale Wars (Episode: "To the Ends of the Earth") (Animal Planet) |
**Outstanding Cinematography for Reality Programming**: **Deadliest Catch (Episode: "Redemption Day") (Discovery Channel)**; The Amazing Race (Episode: "You Don't Get Paid Unless You Win") (CBS); Intervention (Episode: "Rachel") (A&E); Survivor (Episode: "Rice Wars") (CBS); Top Chef (Episode: "Give Me Your Huddled Masses") (Bravo)

=== Commercial ===
Commercial
**Outstanding Commercial**
- **"Born of Fire" (Chrysler)**
  - "Baby" (McDonald's)
  - "Baby Driver" (Subaru)
  - "Conan" (American Express)
  - "Polar Bear" (Nissan)
  - "Questions" (Old Spice Body Wash)

=== Costuming ===
Costuming
| **Outstanding Costumes for a Series**: **The Borgias (Episode: "Lucrezia's Wedding") (Showtime)**; Boardwalk Empire (Episode: "Anastasia") (HBO); Game of Thrones (Episode: "The Pointy End") (HBO); Glee (Episode: "New York") (Fox); Mad Men (Episode: "The Beautiful Girls") (AMC) | **Outstanding Costumes for a Miniseries, Movie, or Special**: **Downton Abbey (Episode: "Part One") (PBS)**; Cinema Verite (HBO); Mildred Pierce (Episode: "Part Two") (HBO); Upstairs Downstairs (PBS) |
**Outstanding Costumes for a Variety, Music Program, or Special**: **Gettysburg (History) (TIE)**; **Portlandia (Episode: "Farm") (IFC) (TIE)**

=== Directing ===
Directing
| **Outstanding Directing for Nonfiction Programming**: **Josh Fox for Gasland (HBO)**; Fenton Bailey and Randy Barbato for Becoming Chaz (OWN); Kent Jones and Martin Scorsese for American Masters (Episodes: "A Letter to Elia" / "Reflecting on Kazan") (PBS); Paul Starkman for Top Chef (Bravo); Bertram van Munster for The Amazing Race (CBS) | **Outstanding Directing for a Variety, Music, or Comedy Special**: **Lonny Price for Sondheim! The Birthday Concert (PBS)**; Laurie-Ann Gibson for Lady Gaga Presents the Monster Ball Tour: At Madison Square Garden (HBO); Louis J. Horvitz for 53rd Grammy Awards (CBS); Don Mischer for 83rd Academy Awards (ABC); Glenn Weiss for 64th Tony Awards (CBS) |

=== Hairstyling ===
Hairstyling
| **Outstanding Hairstyling for a Single-Camera Series**: **Mad Men (Episode: "Christmas Comes But Once a Year") (AMC)**; Boardwalk Empire (Episode: "Boardwalk Empire") (HBO); Game of Thrones (Episode: "A Golden Crown") (HBO); Glee (Episode: "The Sue Sylvester Shuffle") (Fox); Mad Men (Episode: "Hands and Knees") (AMC) | **Outstanding Hairstyling for a Multi-Camera Series or Special**: **Dancing with the Stars (Episode: "Episode 1106") (ABC)**; America's Got Talent (Episode: "Episode 529") (NBC); iCarly (Episode; "iStart a Fan War") (Nickelodeon); The Pee-Wee Herman Show on Broadway (HBO); Saturday Night Live (Episode: "Host: Anne Hathaway") (NBC) |
**Outstanding Hairstyling for a Miniseries or Movie**: **The Kennedys (ReelzChannel)**; Cinema Verite (HBO); Mildred Pierce (Episode: "Part Two") (HBO); The Pillars of the Earth (Starz)

=== Hosting ===
Hosting
**Outstanding Host for a Reality or Reality-Competition Program**
- **Jeff Probst for Survivor (CBS)**
  - Tom Bergeron for Dancing with the Stars (ABC)
  - Cat Deeley for So You Think You Can Dance (Fox)
  - Phil Keoghan for The Amazing Race (CBS)
  - Ryan Seacrest for American Idol (Fox)

=== Interactive Media ===
Interactive Media
**Outstanding Creative Achievement in Interactive Media**
- **Oscar Digital Experience (ABC)**
  - Conan O'Brien Presents: Team Coco (TBS)
  - Fringe: Division (Fox)
  - Grey's Anatomy Sync (ABC)
  - Late Night with Jimmy Fallon (NBC)

=== Lighting Design / Direction ===
Lighting Design / Direction
| **Outstanding Lighting Design / Lighting Direction for a Variety Series**: **So You Think You Can Dance (Episode: "Season 7 Finale: Part 2") (Fox)**; American Idol (Episode: "Finale") (Fox); Conan (Episode: "Love Gets Liposuctioned") (TBS); Dancing with the Stars (Episode: "Episode 1204A") (ABC); Jimmy Kimmel Live! (Episode: "Michel Gondry Directs") (ABC) | **Outstanding Lighting Design / Lighting Direction for a Variety Special**: **53rd Grammy Awards (CBS)**; 83rd Academy Awards (ABC); Lady Gaga Presents the Monster Ball Tour: At Madison Square Garden (HBO) |

=== Main Title Design ===
Programs
**Outstanding Main Title Design**
- **Game of Thrones (HBO)**
  - Any Human Heart (PBS)
  - Boardwalk Empire (HBO)
  - Rubicon (AMC)
  - Too Big to Fail (HBO)

=== Make-up ===
Makeup
| **Outstanding Make-up for a Single-Camera Series (Non-Prosthetic)**: **Boardwalk Empire (Episode: "Boardwalk Empire") (HBO)**; Game of Thrones (Episode: "Winter Is Coming") (HBO); Glee (Episode: "The Rocky Horror Glee Show") (Fox); Mad Men (Episode: "The Rejected") (AMC); True Blood (Episode: "9 Crimes") (HBO) | **Outstanding Make-up for a Multi-Camera Series or Special (Non-Prosthetic)**: **Saturday Night Live (Episode: "Host: Jon Hamm") (NBC)**; Dancing with the Stars (Episode: "Episode 1205") (ABC); How I Met Your Mother (Episode: "Bad News") (CBS); iCarly (Episode: "iStart a Fan War") (Nickelodeon); The Pee-Wee Herman Show on Broadway (HBO) |
| **Outstanding Make-up for a Miniseries or Movie (Non-Prosthetic)**: **The Kennedys (ReelzChannel)**; Cinema Verite (HBO); Mildred Pierce (Episode: "Part Two") (HBO); The Pillars of the Earth (Starz) | **Outstanding Prosthetic Make-up for a Series, Miniseries, Movie, or Special**: **The Walking Dead (Episode: "Days Gone Bye") (AMC)**; The Cape (Episode: "Razer") (NBC); Game of Thrones (Episode: "A Golden Crown") (HBO); Glee (Episode: "The Sue Sylvester Shuffle") (Fox); Grey's Anatomy (Episode: "Superfreak") (ABC) |

=== Music ===
Music
| **Outstanding Music Composition for a Series (Original Dramatic Score)**: **American Masters (Episode: "John Muir in the New World") (PBS)**; 30 Rock (Episode: "100") (NBC); Family Guy (Episode: "And Then There Were Fewer") (Fox); Family Guy (Episode: "Road to the North Pole") (Fox); The Simpsons (Episode: "Treehouse of Horror XXI") (Fox) | **Outstanding Music Composition for a Miniseries, Movie, or Special (Original Dramatic Score)**: **Mildred Pierce (Episode: "Part Five") (HBO)**; Any Human Heart (Episode: "Part Two") (PBS); The Pillars of the Earth (Episode: "Anarchy") (Starz); Sherlock ("A Study in Pink") (PBS); Thurgood (HBO) |
| **Outstanding Music Direction**: **Harry Connick Jr.: In Concert on Broadway (PBS)**; 83rd Academy Awards (ABC); 2011 Rock and Roll Hall of Fame Induction Ceremony (Fuse); An Evening of Stars: Tribute to Chaka Khan (NBC); Hitman Returns: David Foster and Friends (PBS); The Kennedy Center Honors (CBS) | **Outstanding Original Music and Lyrics**: **Saturday Night Live (Episode: "Host: Justin Timberlake", Song: "Justin Timberlake Monologue") (NBC)**; Family Guy (Episode: "Road to the North Pole", Song: "Christmastime is Killing Us") (Fox); Robert Klein: Unfair & Unbalanced (Song: "An American Prayer - Hymn II?") (HBO); Saturday Night Live (Episode: "Host: Tina Fey", Song: "Jack Sparrow") (NBC); Saturday Night Live (Episode: "Host: Justin Timberlake", Song: "3-Way (The Golden Rule)") (NBC) |
**Outstanding Original Main Title Theme Music**: **The Borgias (Showtime)**; Any Human Heart (PBS); Camelot (Starz); Episodes (Showtime); The Kennedys (ReelzChannel); Mildred Pierce (HBO)

=== Picture Editing ===
Picture Editing
| **Outstanding Single-Camera Picture Editing for a Drama Series**: **Boardwalk Empire (Episode: "Boardwalk Empire") (HBO)**; Dexter (Episode: "Take It!") (Showtime); The Killing (Episode: "Pilot") (AMC); Mad Men (Episode: "Blowing Smoke") (AMC); Mad Men (Episode: "The Suitcase") (AMC) | **Outstanding Single-or Multi-Camera Picture Editing for a Comedy Series**: **How I Met Your Mother (Episode: "Subway Wars") (CBS)**; 30 Rock (Episode: "100") (NBC); The Big Bang Theory (Episode: "The Agreement Dissection") (CBS); Modern Family (Episode: "Halloween") (ABC); Modern Family (Episode: "Slow Down Your Neighbors") (ABC) |
| **Outstanding Single-Camera Picture Editing for a Miniseries or Movie**: **Cinema Verite (HBO)**; Downton Abbey (Episode: "Part One") (PBS); Mildred Pierce (Episode: "Part Four") (HBO); Sherlock ("A Study in Pink"); Too Big to Fail (HBO) | **Outstanding Picture Editing for Reality Programming**: **Deadliest Catch (Episode: "Redemption Day") (Discovery Channel)**; The Amazing Race (Episode: "You Don't Get Paid Unless You Win") (CBS); Project Runway (Episode: "There is an 'I' in Team") (Lifetime); Survivor (Episode: "Don't You Work for Me?") (CBS); Top Chef (Episode: "Give Me Your Huddled Masses") (Bravo) |
**Outstanding Picture Editing for Nonfiction Programming**: **Freedom Riders (PBS)**; American Masters ("LENNONYC") (PBS); Anthony Bourdain: No Reservations (Episode: "Haiti") (Travel Channel); Becoming Chaz (OWN); If God Is Willing and da Creek Don't Rise (HBO)

=== Sound ===
Sound
| **Outstanding Sound Editing for a Series**: **Boardwalk Empire (Episode: "Boardwalk Empire") (HBO)**; Game of Thrones (Episode: "A Golden Crown") (HBO); Nikita (Episode: "Pandora") (The CW); True Blood (Episode: "Hitting The Ground") (HBO); The Walking Dead (Episode: "Days Gone Bye") (AMC) | **Outstanding Sound Editing for a Miniseries, Movie, or Special**: **The Pillars of the Earth (Starz)**; Cinema Verite (HBO); Downton Abbey (PBS); Mildred Pierce (Episode: "Part Five") (HBO); Too Big to Fail (HBO) |
| **Outstanding Sound Editing for Nonfiction Programming (Single or Multi-Camera)**: **Gettysburg (History)**; The Amazing Race (Episode: "You Don't Get Paid Unless You Win") (CBS); American Idol (Episode: "Auditions No. 2: New Orleans") (Fox); American Masters (Episode: "Jeff Bridges: The Dude Abides") (PBS); Baseball: The Tenth Inning (Episode: "Top of the Tenth") (PBS); Whale Wars (Episode: "To the Ends of the Earth") (Animal Planet) | **Outstanding Sound Mixing for a Comedy or Drama Series (One Hour)**: **House (Episode: "Bombshells") (Fox)**; Boardwalk Empire (Episode: "Boardwalk Empire") (HBO); Burn Notice (Episode: "Last Stand") (USA); Dexter (Episode: "Take It!") (Showtime); Glee (Episode: "The Substitute") (Fox); Mad Men (Episode: "The Suitcase") (AMC) |
| **Outstanding Sound Mixing for a Miniseries or Movie**: **The Kennedys (Episode: "Lancer and Lace") (ReelzChannel)**; Cinema Verite (HBO); Mildred Pierce (Episode: "Part Five") (HBO); Too Big to Fail (HBO) | **Outstanding Sound Mixing for a Comedy or Drama Series (Half-Hour) and Animation**: **Family Guy (Episode: "Road to the North Pole") (Fox)**; Californication (Episode: "The Last Supper") (Showtime); Modern Family (Episode: "Halloween") (ABC); The Office (Episode: "Andy's Play") (NBC); Parks and Recreation (Episode: "Andy and April's Fancy Party") (NBC) |
| **Outstanding Sound Mixing for a Variety Series or Special**: **American Idol (Episode: "Finale") (Fox)**; 53rd Grammy Awards (CBS); 83rd Academy Awards (ABC) | **Outstanding Sound Mixing for Nonfiction Programming**: **Deadliest Catch (Episode: "Redemption Day") (Discovery Channel)**; The Amazing Race (Episode: "You Don't Get Paid Unless You Win") (CBS); American Idol (Episode: "Auditions No. 2: New Orleans") (Fox); American Masters ("LENNONYC") (PBS); Gettysburg (History) |

=== Special Visual Effects ===
Special Visual Effects
| **Outstanding Special Visual Effects**: **Boardwalk Empire (Episode: "Boardwalk Empire") (HBO)**; The Borgias (Episode: "The Poisoned Chalice" / "The Assassin") (Showtime); Game of Thrones (Episode: "Fire and Blood") (HBO); Stargate Universe (Episode: "Awakening") (Syfy); The Walking Dead (Episode: "Days Gone Bye") (AMC) | **Outstanding Special Visual Effects for a Miniseries or Movie**: **Gettysburg (History)**; Mildred Pierce (Episode: "Part Five") (HBO); The Pillars of the Earth (Episode: "Witchcraft") (Starz); Sherlock ("A Study in Pink") (PBS) |

=== Stunt Coordination ===
Stunt Coordination
**Outstanding Stunt Coordination**
- **Southland (Episode: "Graduation Day") (TNT)**
  - Game of Thrones (Episode: "The Wolf and the Lion") (HBO)
  - Hawaii Five-0 (Episode: "Ua Hiki Mai Kapalena Pau (Until the End is Near)") (CBS)
  - Spartacus: Gods of the Arena (Episode: "The Bitter End") (Starz)

=== Technical Direction ===
Technical Direction
| **Outstanding Technical Direction, Camerawork, Video Control for a Series**: **American Idol (Episode: "Finale") (Fox)**; 30 Rock (Episode: "Live Show (West Coast") (NBC); The Daily Show with Jon Stewart (Episode: "Episode 15135") (Comedy Central); Dancing with the Stars (Episode: "Episode 1104A") (ABC); Saturday Night Live (Episode: "Host: Justin Timberlake") (NBC) | **Outstanding Technical Direction, Camerawork, Video Control for a Miniseries, Movie, or Special**: **Great Performances: Don Pasquale (PBS)**; 53rd Grammy Awards (CBS); 83rd Academy Awards (ABC); The Kennedy Center Honors (CBS); Lady Gaga Presents the Monster Ball Tour: At Madison Square Garden (HBO) |

=== Writing ===
Writing
| **Outstanding Writing for Nonfiction Programming**: **Freedom Riders (PBS)**; Anthony Bourdain: No Reservations (Episode: "Haiti") (Travel Channel); Gasland (HBO); Gettysburg (History); Moguls and Movie Stars (Episode: "The Birth of Hollywood") (TCM) | **Outstanding Writing for a Variety, Music, or Comedy Special**: **64th Tony Awards (CBS)**; Colin Quinn: Long Story Short (HBO); Louis C.K.: Hilarious (Epix); Night of Too Many Stars: An Overbooked Benefit for Autism Education (Comedy Central); The Real Women of SNL (NBC) |

== Programs with multiple awards ==
By network (Note: Only includes categories above)

- HBO – 15
- PBS – 10
- Fox – 9
- CBS – 7
- NBC – 5
- Discovery Channel / History – 4
- ABC / Cartoon Network / ReelzChannel – 3

By program

- Boardwalk Empire – 7
- Deadliest Catch / Gettysburg – 4
