= 63rd Primetime Emmy Awards =

2011 American television programming awards

- Promotional poster
- Date: September 18, 2011 (Ceremony); September 10, 2011 (Creative Arts Awards)
- Location: Nokia Theatre; Los Angeles, California
- Presented by: Academy of Television Arts and Sciences
- Hosted by: Jane Lynch

Highlights
- Most awards: Major: Modern Family (5); All: Boardwalk Empire (7)
- Most nominations: Modern Family (11)
- Comedy Series: Modern Family
- Drama Series: Mad Men
- Miniseries or Movie: Downton Abbey
- Reality-Competition Program: The Amazing Race
- Variety, Music or Comedy Series: The Daily Show with Jon Stewart

Television/radio coverage
- Network: Fox
- Produced by: Mark Burnett; Audrey Morrisey
- Directed by: Joe DeMaio

The 63rd Primetime Emmy Awards, honoring the best in prime time television programming from June 1, 2010, until May 31, 2011, were held on Sunday, September 18, 2011, at the Nokia Theatre in Downtown Los Angeles, California, where 25 awards were presented. Fox televised the ceremony within the United States. Fox's Glee star Jane Lynch hosted the Emmys for the first time. The Creative Arts Emmy Awards ceremony was held on September 10.

The nominations were announced live on Thursday, July 14, 2011, at 5:40 a.m. PDT (12:40 UTC) at the Leonard H. Goldenson Theatre in North Hollywood, Los Angeles. The nominations were announced by Melissa McCarthy of Mike & Molly and Joshua Jackson of Fringe.

The biggest winner of the night was ABC's Modern Family. The series ended the event with five wins, including Outstanding Comedy Series for the second consecutive year. For the fourth time, the Outstanding Drama Series category was won by AMC's Mad Men. It is also the third series to win four times consecutively in that category. Downton Abbey walked away with the award for Outstanding Miniseries or Movie, with four wins overall.

This year's ceremony was watched by 12.4 million people, down 8% from last year's show. The ceremony received mixed reviews from critics, with many praising the performance of Lynch as the host but criticizing the overall quality of the production, particularly the presenters and the orchestra.

Beginning this year, the Outstanding Miniseries and Outstanding Television Movie categories were merged. This was due to the continuing decline in the number of miniseries being produced; the previous two ceremonies only had two miniseries nominated. The merge was short-lived however when the separate categories returned, beginning in 2014.

== Winners and nominees ==
Winners are listed first and highlighted in bold:

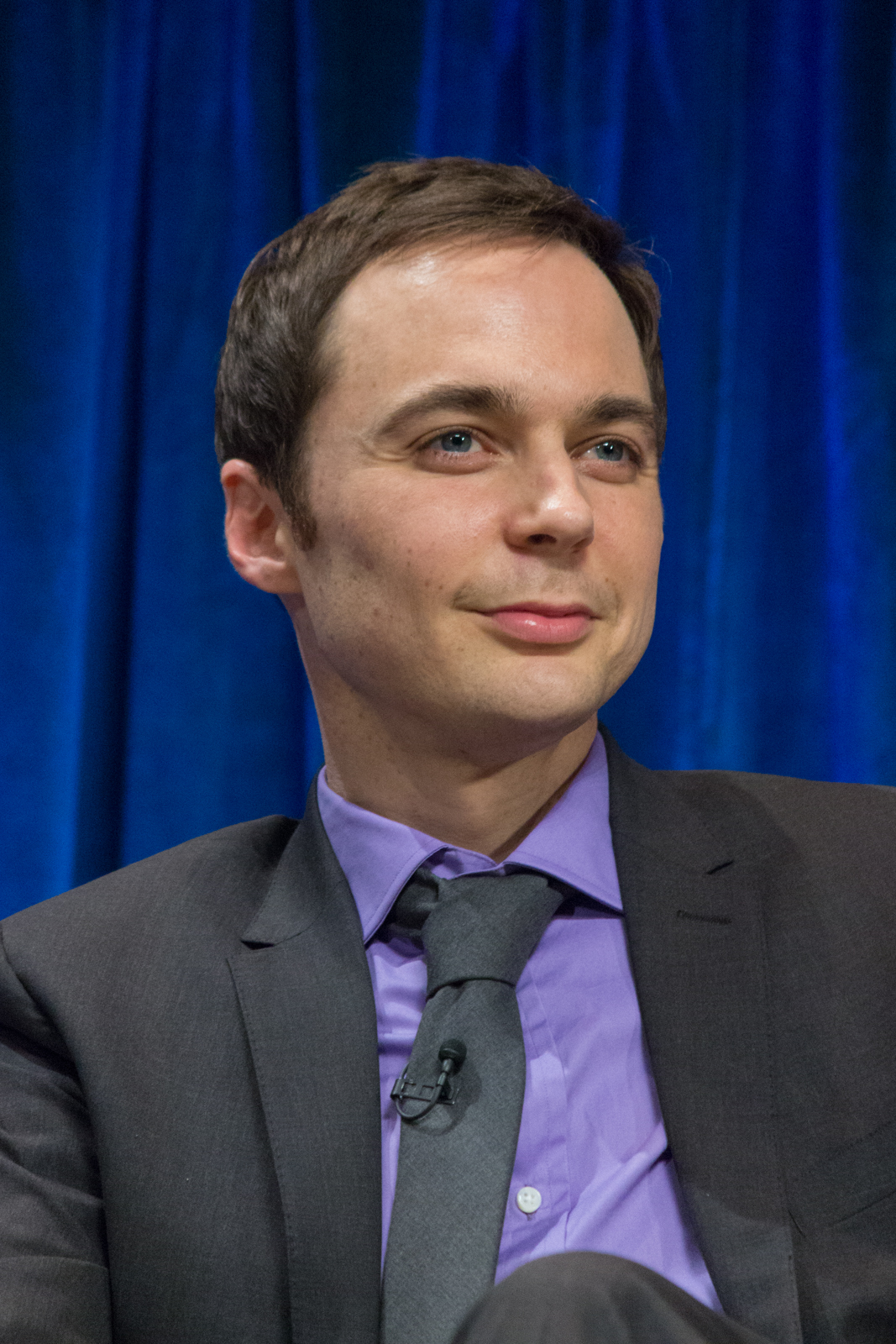
Jim Parsons, Outstanding Lead Actor in a Comedy Series winner

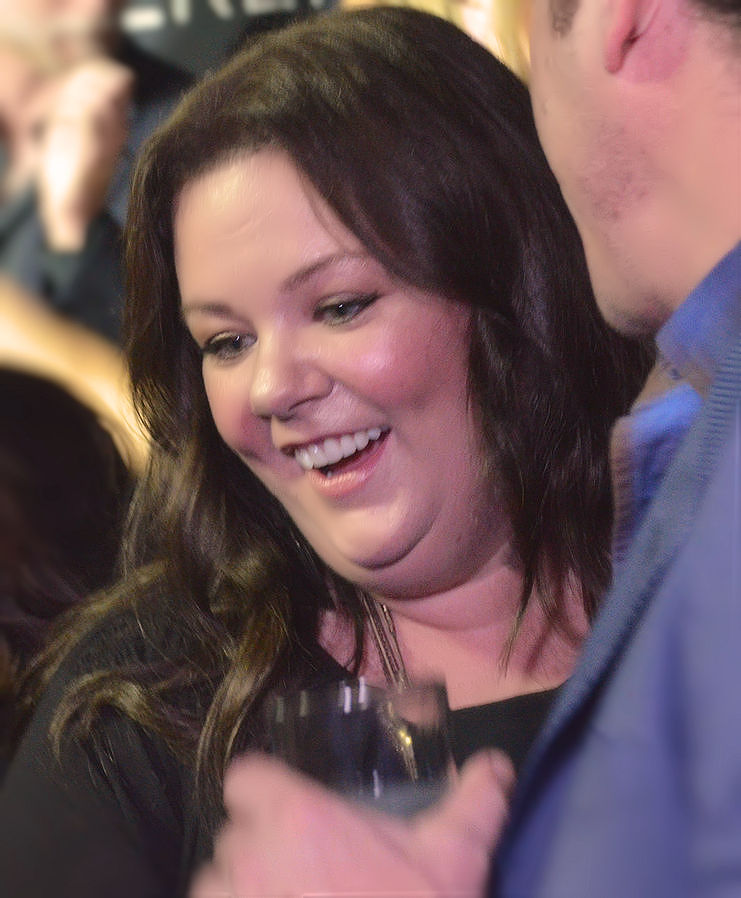
Melissa McCarthy, Outstanding Lead Actress in a Comedy Series winner

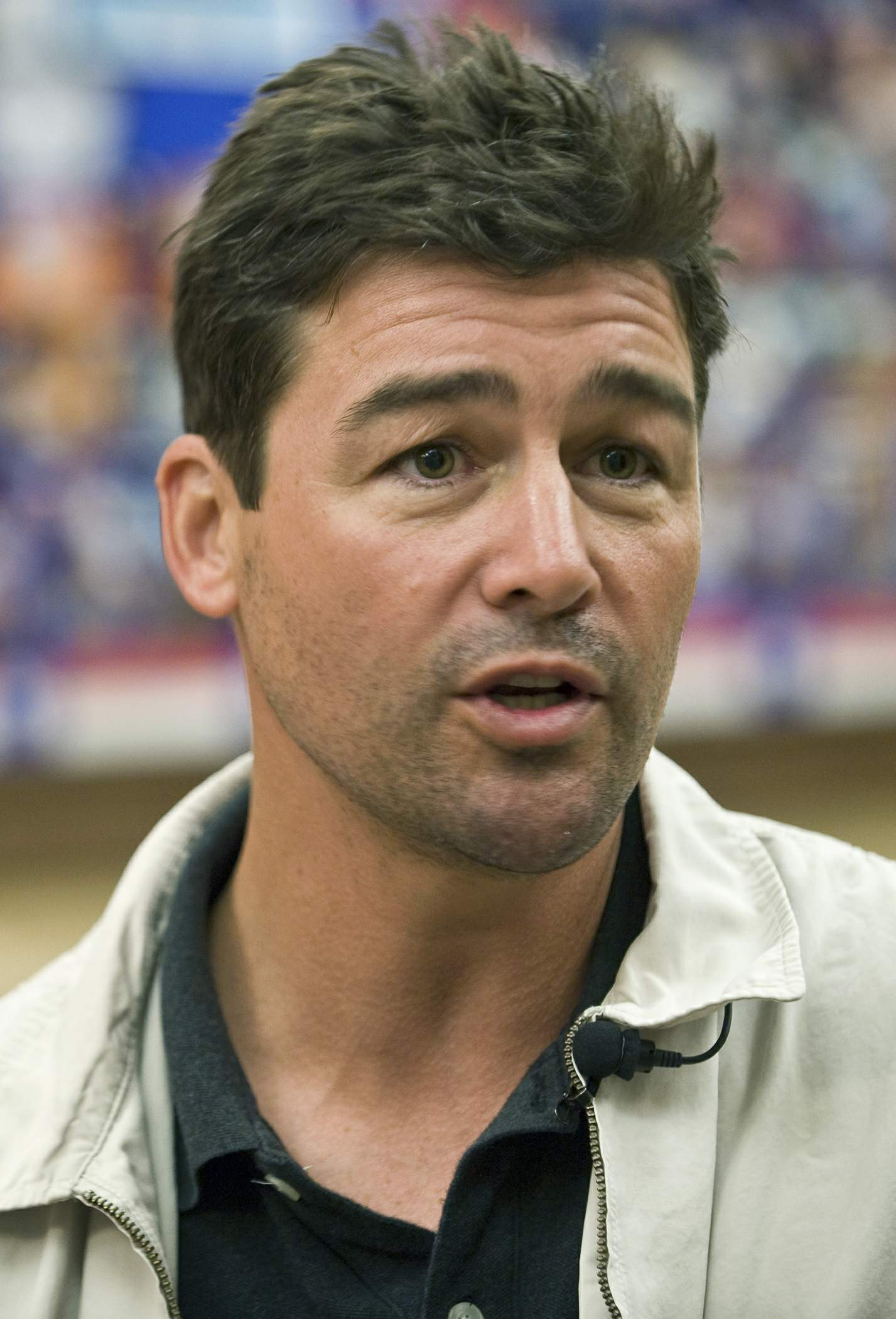
Kyle Chandler, Outstanding Lead Actor in a Drama Series winner

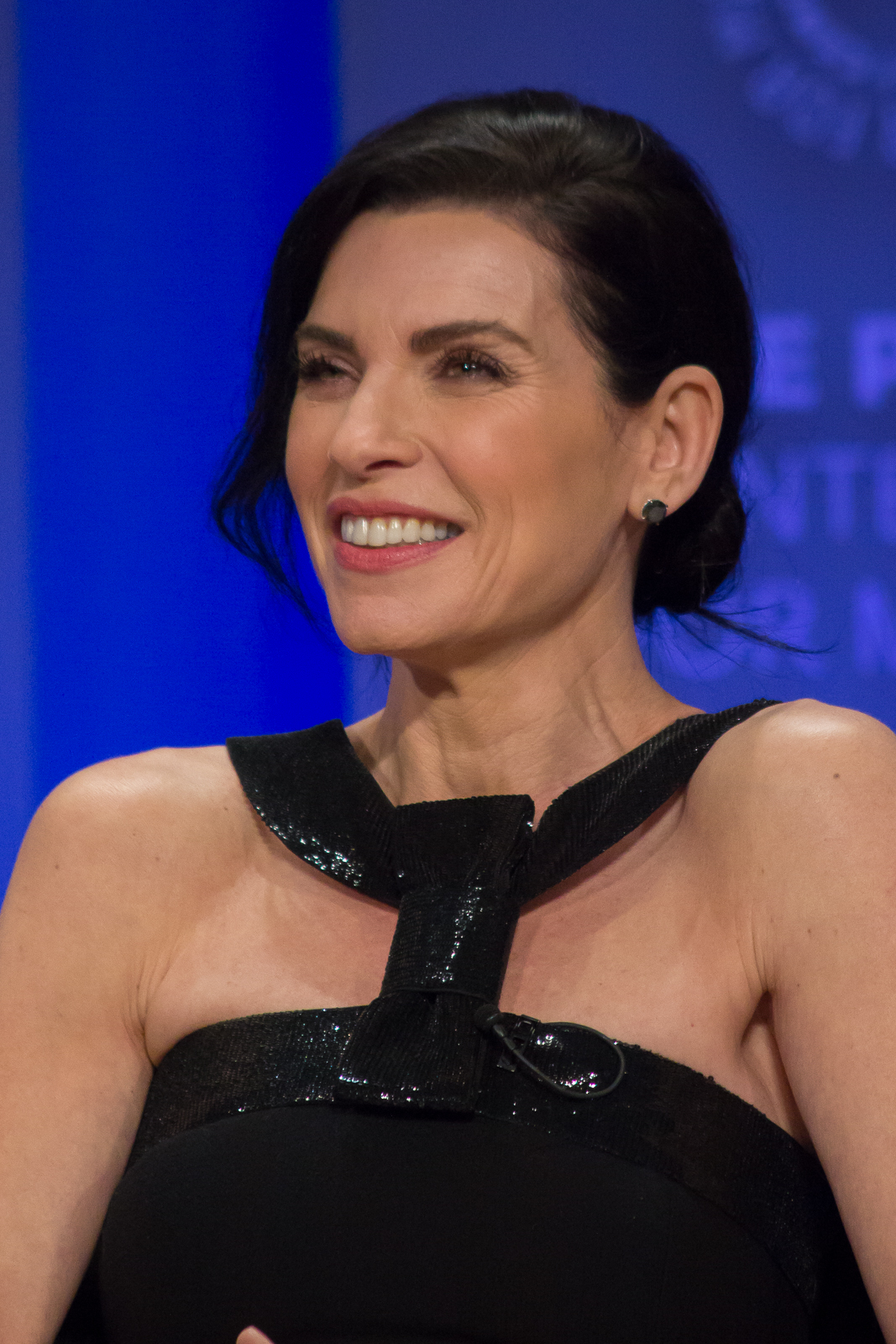
Julianna Margulies, Outstanding Lead Actress in a Drama Series winner

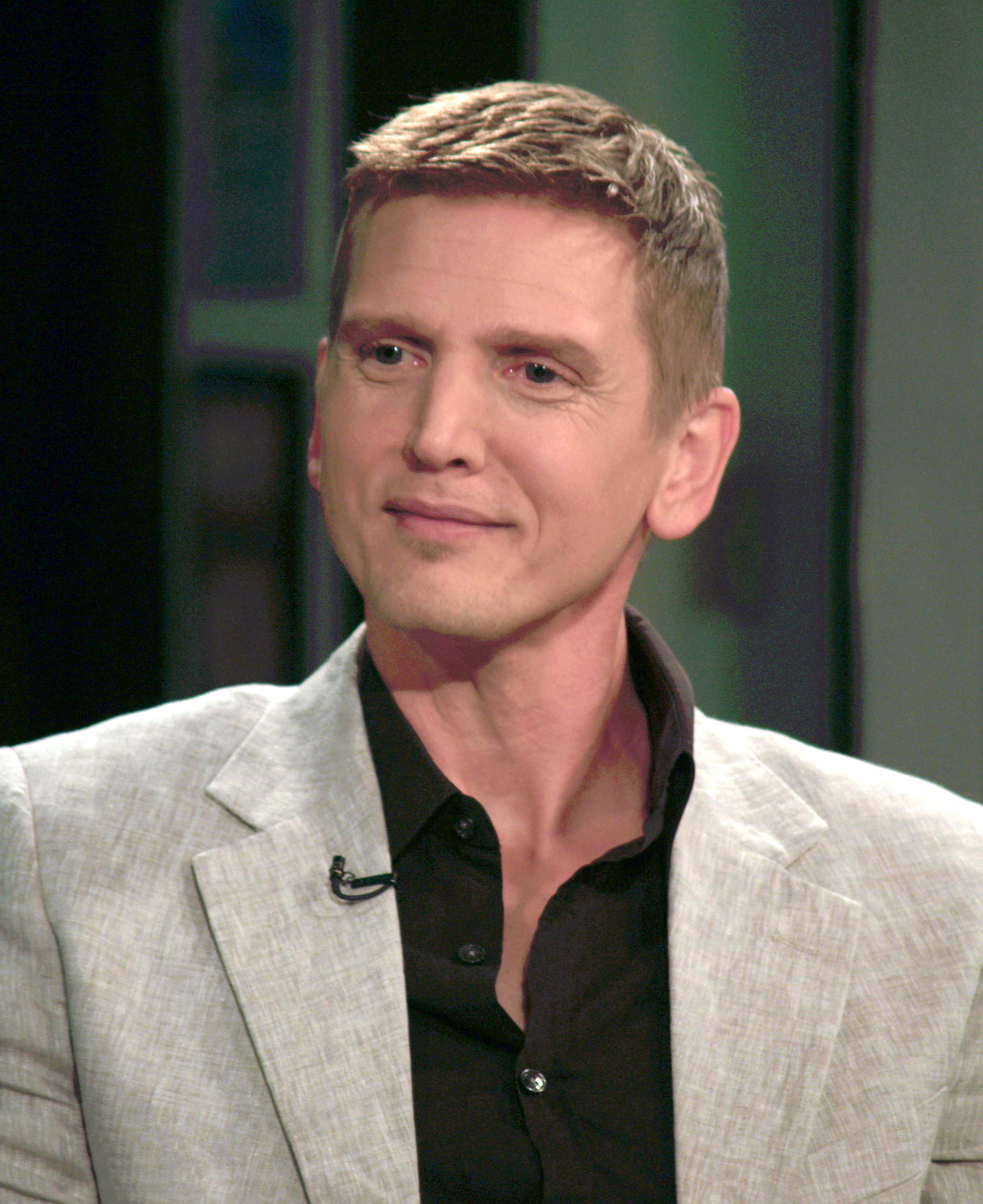
Barry Pepper, Outstanding Lead Actor in a Miniseries or Movie winner

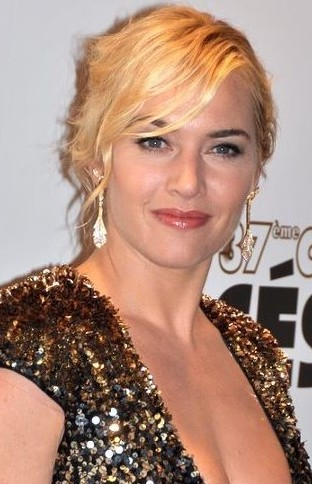
Kate Winslet, Outstanding Lead Actress in a Miniseries or Movie winner

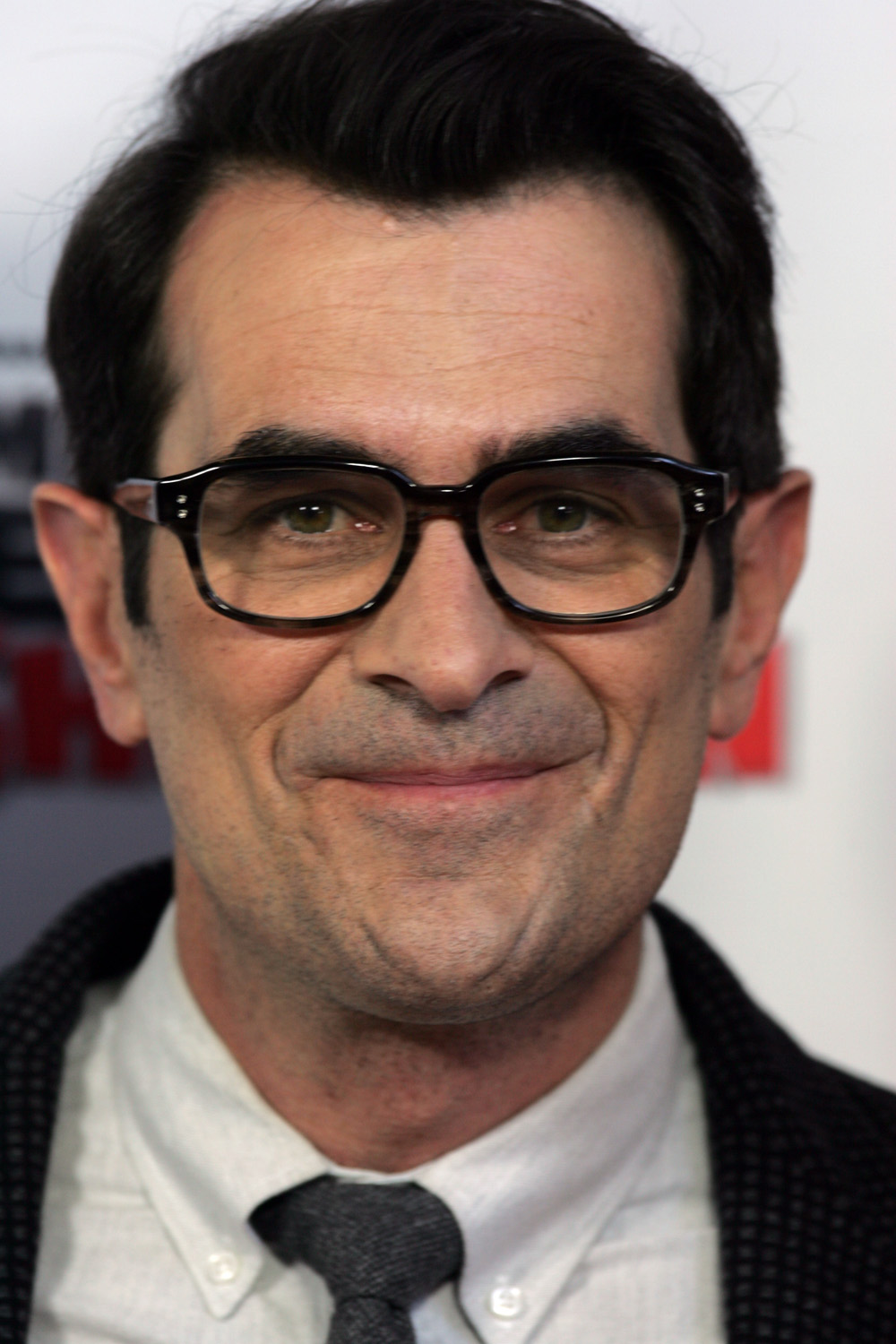
Ty Burrell, Outstanding Supporting Actor in a Comedy Series winner

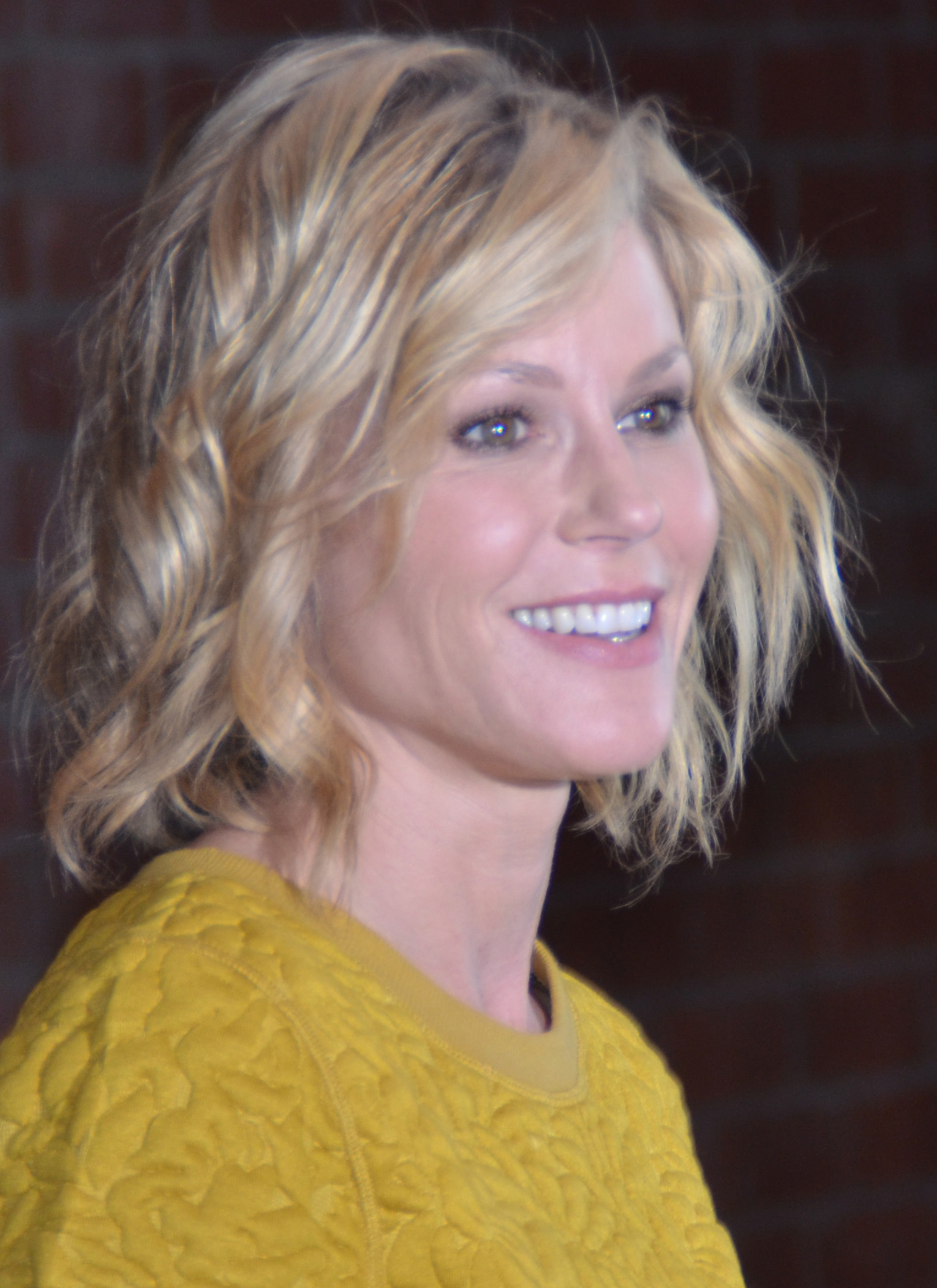
Julie Bowen, Outstanding Supporting Actress in a Comedy Series winner

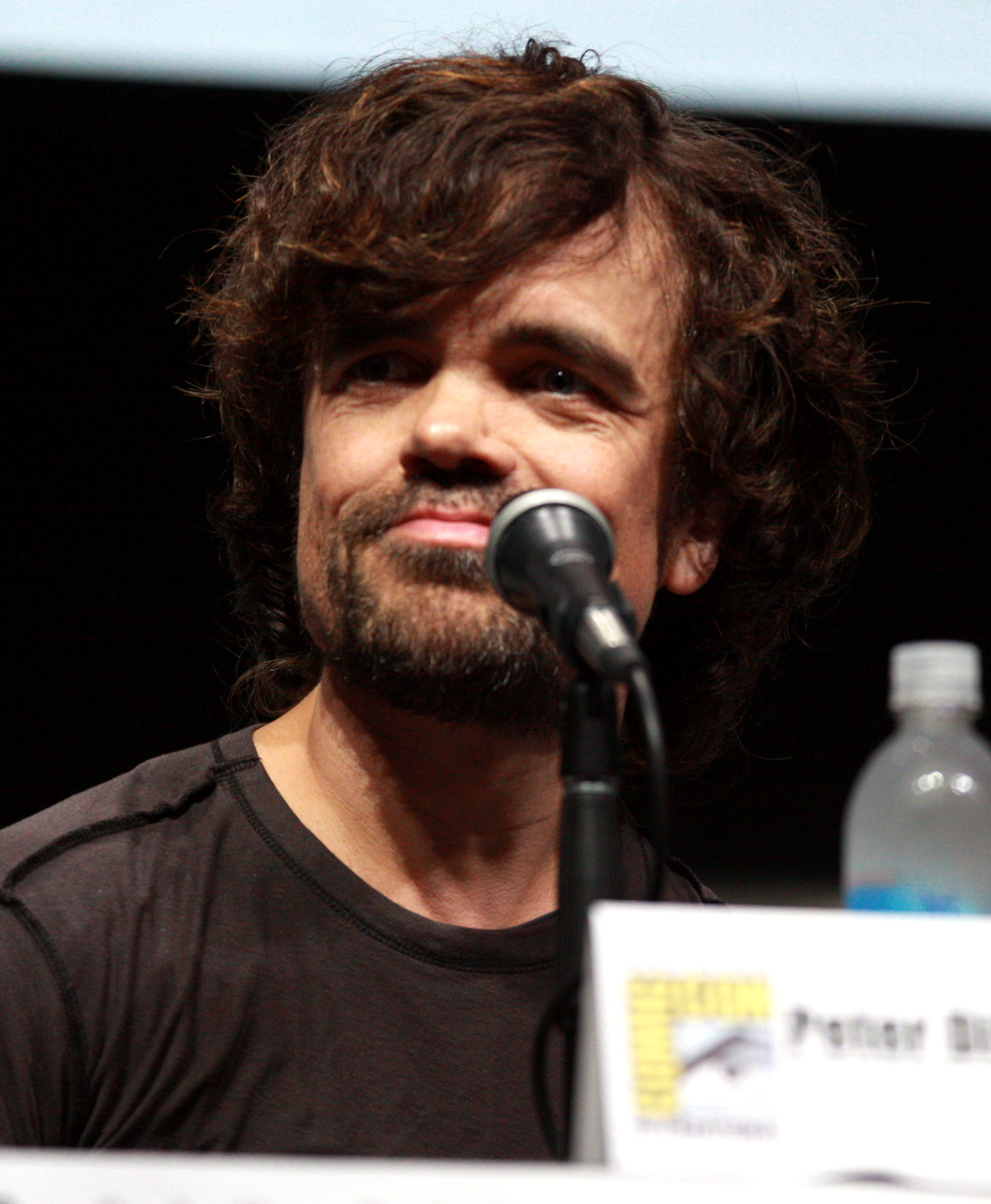
Peter Dinklage, Outstanding Supporting Actor in a Drama Series winner

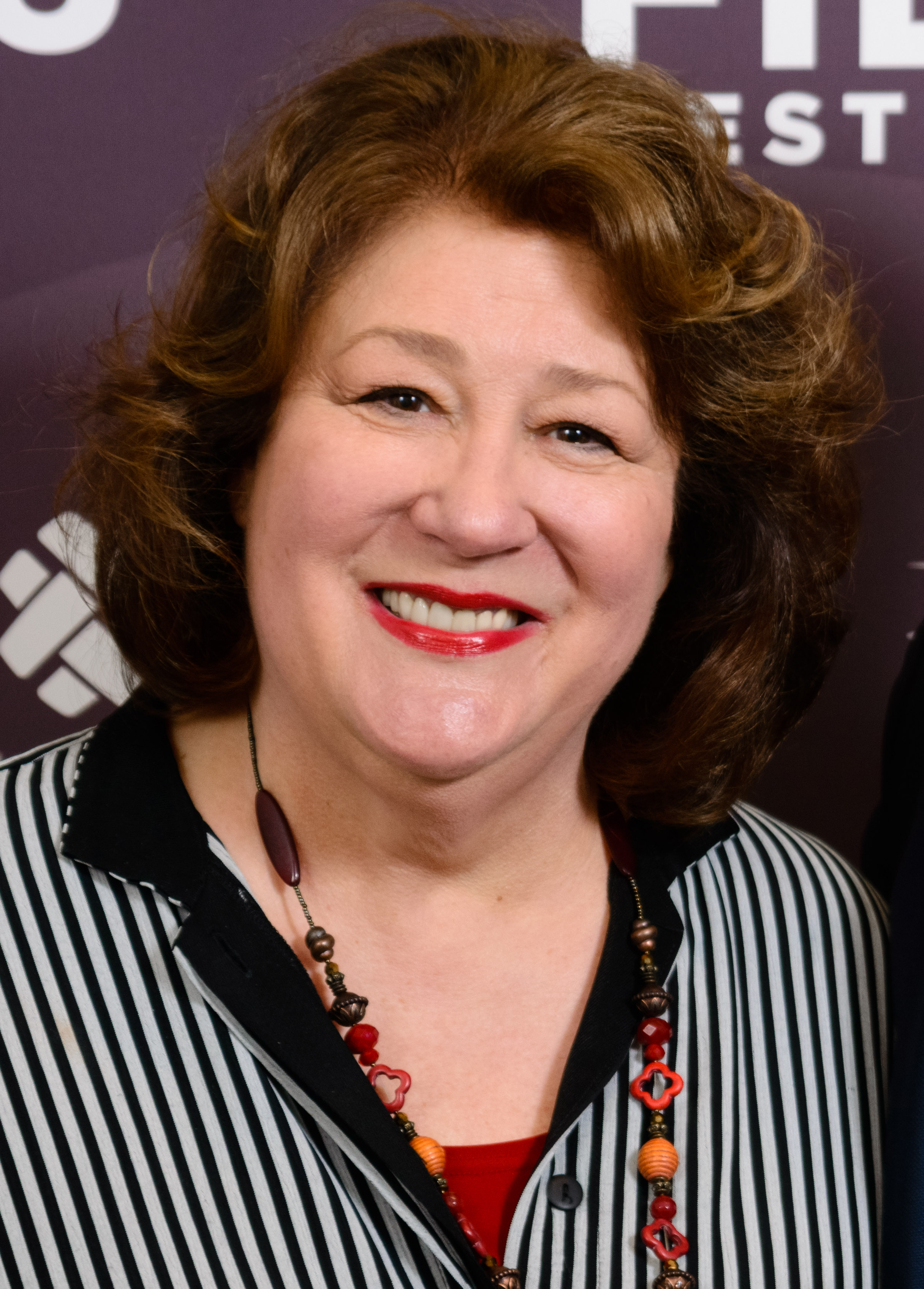
Margo Martindale, Outstanding Supporting Actress in a Drama Series winner

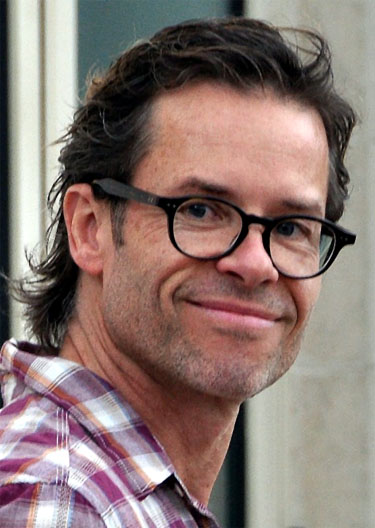
Guy Pearce, Outstanding Supporting Actor in a Miniseries or Movie winner

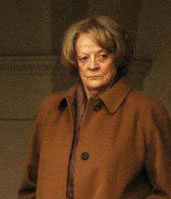
Maggie Smith, Outstanding Supporting Actress in a Miniseries or Movie winner

=== Programs ===
Programs
**Outstanding Comedy Series**: **Modern Family (ABC)**; 30 Rock (NBC); The Big Bang Theory (CBS); Glee (Fox); The Office (NBC); Parks and Recreation (NBC)	**Outstanding Drama Series**: **Mad Men (AMC)**; Boardwalk Empire (HBO); Dexter (Showtime); Friday Night Lights (DirecTV); Game of Thrones (HBO); The Good Wife (CBS)
**Outstanding Variety, Music or Comedy Series**: **The Daily Show with Jon Stewart (Comedy Central)**; The Colbert Report (Comedy Central); Conan (TBS); Late Night with Jimmy Fallon (NBC); Real Time with Bill Maher (HBO); Saturday Night Live (NBC)	**Outstanding Miniseries or Movie**: **Downton Abbey (PBS)**; Cinema Verite (HBO); The Kennedys (ReelzChannel); Mildred Pierce (HBO); The Pillars of the Earth (Starz); Too Big to Fail (HBO)
**Outstanding Reality-Competition Program**: **The Amazing Race (CBS)**; American Idol (Fox); Dancing with the Stars (ABC); Project Runway (Lifetime); So You Think You Can Dance (Fox); Top Chef (Bravo)

=== Acting ===
==== Lead performances ====
Lead performances
**Outstanding Lead Actor in a Comedy Series**: **Jim Parsons – The Big Bang Theory as Dr. Sheldon Cooper (CBS)**; Alec Baldwin – 30 Rock as Jack Donaghy (NBC); Steve Carell – The Office as Michael Scott (NBC); Louis C.K. – Louie as Louie (FX); Johnny Galecki – The Big Bang Theory as Dr. Leonard Hofstadter (CBS); Matt LeBlanc – Episodes as himself (Showtime)	**Outstanding Lead Actress in a Comedy Series**: **Melissa McCarthy – Mike & Molly as Molly Flynn (CBS)**; Edie Falco – Nurse Jackie as Jackie Peyton, RN (Showtime); Tina Fey – 30 Rock as Liz Lemon (NBC); Laura Linney – The Big C as Cathy Jamison (Showtime); Martha Plimpton – Raising Hope as Virginia Chance (Fox); Amy Poehler – Parks and Recreation as Leslie Knope (NBC)
**Outstanding Lead Actor in a Drama Series**: **Kyle Chandler – Friday Night Lights as Eric Taylor (DirecTV)**; Steve Buscemi – Boardwalk Empire as Enoch "Nucky" Thompson (HBO); Michael C. Hall – Dexter as Dexter Morgan (Showtime); Jon Hamm – Mad Men as Don Draper (AMC); Hugh Laurie – House as Dr. Gregory House (Fox); Timothy Olyphant – Justified as Raylan Givens (FX)	**Outstanding Lead Actress in a Drama Series**: **Julianna Margulies – The Good Wife as Alicia Florrick (CBS)**; Kathy Bates – Harry's Law as Harriet "Harry" Korn (NBC); Connie Britton – Friday Night Lights as Tami Taylor (DirecTV); Mireille Enos – The Killing as Sarah Linden (AMC); Mariska Hargitay – Law & Order: Special Victims Unit as Olivia Benson (NBC); Elisabeth Moss – Mad Men as Peggy Olson (AMC)
**Outstanding Lead Actor in a Miniseries or Movie**: **Barry Pepper – The Kennedys as Robert F. Kennedy (ReelzChannel)**; Idris Elba – Luther as DCI John Luther (BBC America); Laurence Fishburne – Thurgood as Thurgood Marshall (HBO); William Hurt – Too Big to Fail as Henry Paulson (HBO); Greg Kinnear – The Kennedys as John F. Kennedy (ReelzChannel); Édgar Ramírez – Carlos as Ilich Ramírez Sánchez (Sundance Channel)	**Outstanding Lead Actress in a Miniseries or Movie**: **Kate Winslet – Mildred Pierce as Mildred Pierce (HBO)**; Taraji P. Henson – Taken from Me: The Tiffany Rubin Story as Tiffany Rubin (Lifetime); Diane Lane – Cinema Verite as Patricia "Pat" Loud (HBO); Jean Marsh – Upstairs Downstairs as Rose Buck (PBS); Elizabeth McGovern – Downton Abbey as Cora Crawley, Countess of Grantham (PBS)

==== Supporting performances ====
Supporting performances
**Outstanding Supporting Actor in a Comedy Series**: **Ty Burrell – Modern Family as Phil Dunphy (ABC)**; Chris Colfer – Glee as Kurt Hummel (Fox); Jon Cryer – Two and a Half Men as Dr. Alan Harper (CBS); Jesse Tyler Ferguson – Modern Family as Mitchell Pritchett (ABC); Ed O'Neill – Modern Family as Jay Pritchett (ABC); Eric Stonestreet – Modern Family as Cameron Tucker (ABC)	**Outstanding Supporting Actress in a Comedy Series**: **Julie Bowen – Modern Family as Claire Dunphy (ABC)**; Jane Krakowski – 30 Rock as Jenna Maroney (NBC); Jane Lynch – Glee as Sue Sylvester (Fox); Sofía Vergara – Modern Family as Gloria Delgado-Pritchett (ABC); Betty White – Hot in Cleveland as Elka Ostrovsky (TV Land); Kristen Wiig – Saturday Night Live as various characters (NBC)
**Outstanding Supporting Actor in a Drama Series**: **Peter Dinklage – Game of Thrones as Tyrion Lannister (HBO)**; Andre Braugher – Men of a Certain Age as Owen Thoreau Jr. (TNT); Josh Charles – The Good Wife as Will Gardner (CBS); Alan Cumming – The Good Wife as Eli Gold (CBS); Walton Goggins – Justified as Boyd Crowder (FX); John Slattery – Mad Men as Roger Sterling Jr. (AMC)	**Outstanding Supporting Actress in a Drama Series**: **Margo Martindale – Justified as Mags Bennett (FX)**; Christine Baranski – The Good Wife as Diane Lockhart (CBS); Michelle Forbes – The Killing as Mitch Larsen (AMC); Christina Hendricks – Mad Men as Joan Harris (AMC); Kelly Macdonald – Boardwalk Empire as Margaret Schroeder (HBO); Archie Panjabi – The Good Wife as Kalinda Sharma (CBS)
**Outstanding Supporting Actor in a Miniseries or Movie**: **Guy Pearce – Mildred Pierce as Monty Beragon (HBO)**; Paul Giamatti – Too Big to Fail as Ben Bernanke (HBO); Brían F. O'Byrne – Mildred Pierce as Bert Pierce (HBO); Tom Wilkinson – The Kennedys as Joseph P. Kennedy Sr. (ReelzChannel); James Woods – Too Big to Fail as Dick Fuld Jr. (HBO)	**Outstanding Supporting Actress in a Miniseries or Movie**: **Maggie Smith – Downton Abbey as Violet Crawley, Dowager Countess of Grantham (PBS)**; Eileen Atkins – Upstairs Downstairs as Maud, Lady Holland (PBS); Melissa Leo – Mildred Pierce as Lucy Gessler (HBO); Mare Winningham – Mildred Pierce as Ida Corwin (HBO); Evan Rachel Wood – Mildred Pierce as Veda Pierce (HBO)

=== Directing ===
Directing
**Outstanding Directing for a Comedy Series**: **Modern Family: "Halloween" – Michael Spiller (ABC)**; 30 Rock: "Live Show" – Beth McCarthy-Miller (NBC); How I Met Your Mother: "Subway Wars" – Pamela Fryman (CBS); Modern Family: "See You Next Fall" – Steven Levitan (ABC); Modern Family: "Slow Down Your Neighbors" – Gail Mancuso (ABC)	**Outstanding Directing for a Drama Series**: **Boardwalk Empire: "Boardwalk Empire" – Martin Scorsese (HBO)**; Boardwalk Empire: "Anastasia" – Jeremy Podeswa (HBO); The Borgias: "The Poisoned Chalice" / "The Assassin" – Neil Jordan (Showtime); Game of Thrones: "Winter Is Coming" – Tim Van Patten (HBO); The Killing: "Pilot" – Patty Jenkins (AMC)
**Outstanding Directing for a Variety, Music or Comedy Series**: **Saturday Night Live: "Host: Justin Timberlake" – Don Roy King (NBC)**; American Idol: "Episode 1024/1025A" – Gregg Gelfand (Fox); The Colbert Report: "Episode 6112" – James Hoskinson (Comedy Central); The Daily Show with Jon Stewart: "Episode 16048" – Chuck O'Neil (Comedy Central); Late Show with David Letterman: "Show 3333" – Jerry Foley (CBS)	**Outstanding Directing for a Miniseries, Movie or Dramatic Special**: **Downton Abbey – Brian Percival (PBS)**; Carlos – Olivier Assayas (Sundance Channel); Cinema Verite – Shari Springer Berman and Robert Pulcini (HBO); Mildred Pierce – Todd Haynes (HBO); Too Big to Fail – Curtis Hanson (HBO)

=== Writing ===
Writing
**Outstanding Writing for a Comedy Series**: **Modern Family: "Caught in the Act" – Steven Levitan and Jeffrey Richman (ABC)**; 30 Rock: "Reaganing" – Matt Hubbard (NBC); Episodes: "Episode Seven" – David Crane and Jeffrey Klarik (Showtime); Louie: "Poker/Divorce" – Louis C.K. (FX); The Office: "Goodbye, Michael" – Greg Daniels (NBC)	**Outstanding Writing for a Drama Series**: **Friday Night Lights: "Always" – Jason Katims (DirecTV)**; Game of Thrones: "Baelor" – David Benioff and D. B. Weiss (HBO); The Killing: "Pilot" – Veena Sud (AMC); Mad Men: "Blowing Smoke" – Andre Jacquemetton and Maria Jacquemetton (AMC); Mad Men: "The Suitcase" – Matthew Weiner (AMC)
**Outstanding Writing for a Variety, Music or Comedy Series**: **The Daily Show with Jon Stewart (Comedy Central)**; The Colbert Report (Comedy Central); Conan (TBS); Late Night with Jimmy Fallon (NBC); Saturday Night Live (NBC)	**Outstanding Writing for a Miniseries, Movie or Dramatic Special**: **Downton Abbey – Julian Fellowes (PBS)**; Mildred Pierce – Todd Haynes and Jonathan Raymond (HBO); Sherlock: A Study in Pink – Steven Moffat (PBS); Too Big to Fail – Peter Gould (HBO); Upstairs Downstairs – Heidi Thomas (PBS)

== Most major nominations ==
Networks with multiple major nominations (Note: "Major" constitutes the categories listed above: Program, Acting, Directing, and Writing. Does not include the technical categories.)
Network	No. of Nominations
HBO	29
NBC	19
CBS	14
ABC	12
AMC	11
Fox	8
Showtime	7

Programs with multiple major nominations
Program	Category	Network	No. of Nominations
Modern Family	Comedy	ABC	11
Mildred Pierce	Miniseries	HBO	9
Mad Men	Drama	AMC	7
30 Rock	Comedy	NBC	6
The Good Wife	Drama	CBS	6
Too Big to Fail	Movie	HBO	6
Boardwalk Empire	Drama	HBO	5
Downton Abbey	Miniseries	PBS	5
Friday Night Lights	Drama	DirecTV	4
Game of Thrones	Drama	HBO	4
The Kennedys	Miniseries	ReelzChannel	4
The Killing	Drama	AMC	4
Saturday Night Live	Variety	NBC	4
The Big Bang Theory	Comedy	CBS	3
Cinema Verite	Movie	HBO	3
The Colbert Report	Variety	Comedy Central	3
The Daily Show with Jon Stewart	Variety	Comedy Central	3
Glee	Comedy	Fox	3
Justified	Drama	FX	3
The Office	Comedy	NBC	3
Upstairs Downstairs	Miniseries	PBS	3
American Idol	Competition	Fox	2
Carlos	Miniseries	Sundance Channel	2
Conan	Variety	TBS	2
Dexter	Drama	Showtime	2
Episodes	Comedy	Showtime	2
Late Night with Jimmy Fallon	Variety	NBC	2
Louie	Comedy	FX	2
Parks and Recreation	Comedy	NBC	2

== Most major awards ==
Networks with multiple major awards
Network	No. of Awards
ABC	5
CBS	4
HBO	4
PBS	4
Comedy Central	2
DirecTV	2

Programs with multiple major awards
Program	Category	Network	No. of Awards
Modern Family	Comedy	ABC	5
Downton Abbey	Miniseries	PBS	4
The Daily Show with Jon Stewart	Variety	Comedy Central	2
Friday Night Lights	Drama	DirecTV	2
Mildred Pierce	Miniseries	HBO	2

== Presenters ==
The awards were presented by the following:

Name(s)	Role
Jimmy Fallon; Jimmy Kimmel	Presented the award for Outstanding Supporting Actress in a Comedy Series
Julianna Margulies	Presented the award for Outstanding Supporting Actor in a Comedy Series
Ricky Gervais; Jane Lynch	Presented the award for Outstanding Directing for a Comedy Series
Will Arnett; Zooey Deschanel	Presented the award for Outstanding Writing for a Comedy Series
Charlie Sheen	Presented the award for Outstanding Lead Actor in a Comedy Series
Rob Lowe; Sofía Vergara	Presented the award for Outstanding Lead Actress in a Comedy Series
Kaley Cuoco; David Spade	Presented the awards for Outstanding Reality-Competition Program and Outstanding Writing for a Variety Series
Lea Michele; Ian Somerhalder	Presented the award for Outstanding Directing for a Variety Series
Scott Caan; Anna Paquin	Presented the award for Outstanding Variety Series
Jon Cryer; Ashton Kutcher	Presented the awards for Outstanding Writing for a Drama Series and Outstanding Supporting Actress in a Drama Series
Loretta Devine; Paul McCrane	Presented the award for Outstanding Directing for a Drama Series
Jason O'Mara; Kerry Washington	Presented the award for Outstanding Supporting Actor in a Drama Series
Bryan Cranston; Katie Holmes	Presented the award for Outstanding Lead Actress in a Drama Series
Drew Barrymore; Annie Ilonzeh; Minka Kelly; Rachael Taylor	Presented the award for Outstanding Lead Actor in a Drama Series
Kevin Connolly; Kevin Dillon; Jerry Ferrara; Adrien Grenier; Jeremy Piven	Presented the awards for Outstanding Writing for a Miniseries, Movie or Dramatic Special and Outstanding Supporting Actress in a Miniseries or Movie
Melissa McCarthy; Amy Poehler	Presented the awards for Outstanding Lead Actor in a Miniseries or Movie and Outstanding Directing for a Miniseries, Movie or Dramatic Special
John Shaffner	Presented the In Memoriam segment
David Boreanaz; Anna Torv	Presented the award for Outstanding Supporting Actor in a Miniseries or Movie
Claire Danes; Hugh Laurie	Presented the award for Outstanding Lead Actress in a Miniseries or Movie
Don Cheadle	Presented the award for Outstanding Miniseries or Movie
Maria Bello; William H. Macy	Presented the award for Outstanding Drama Series
Gwyneth Paltrow	Presented the award for Outstanding Comedy Series

== In Memoriam ==
The annual In Memoriam segment was presented by John Shaffner and featured the Canadian Tenors performing the song "Hallelujah". The segment was extended for this ceremony, as executive producer Mark Burnett stated that "it [didn't] need to be a bummer... It can be a celebration".

- Cliff Robertson
- Elizabeth Taylor
- Anne Francis
- James MacArthur
- Peter Falk
- Harold Gould
- Stanley Frazen
- James Arness
- Janet MacLachlan
- Madelyn Pugh Davis
- Steve Landesberg
- Blake Edwards
- Betty Garrett
- John Cossette
- Bill Erwin
- Barbara Billingsley
- Leslie Nielsen
- Tom Bosley
- Reza Badiyi
- Leonard Stern
- Ryan Dunn
- Denise Cramsey
- Frank Potenza
- Bob Banner
- Andy Whitfield
- Fred Steiner
- Jill Clayburgh
- John Dye
- Jack LaLanne
- Al Masini
- Sada Thompson
- Laura Ziskin
- Don Meredith
- Sherwood Schwartz
- Bubba Smith
- Stephen J. Cannell

== Memorable moments ==
=== Opening number ===
The show opened with Jane Lynch performing a pre-taped opening number which showed the TV world as being contained inside of a large building, parodying Rear Window. Lynch walked through the building and entered the universe of shows including The Big Bang Theory, Mad Men, Parks and Recreation, MythBusters and Glee (the show of which Lynch is a cast member) among others. Lynch's lyrics satirized elements of each show and television in general. The ceremony culminated with Lynch entering the theatre and performing a short dance number, which ended with a fireworks show. The opening number received a standing ovation.

=== Emmytones ===
Throughout the night, the "Emmytones" introduced each genre in the form of a short jingle. They consisted of Zachary Levi ("Chuck"), Cobie Smulders ("How I Met Your Mother"), Kate Flannery ("The Office"), Wilmer Valderrama ("Royal Pains"), Joel McHale ("Community") and nominee Taraji P. Henson ("Person of Interest"). The Emmytones received mixed to negative reviews, with many critics citing them as unimportant and others calling them "time fillers."

=== Award for Outstanding Lead Actress in a Comedy Series ===
For the presentation of the award for Outstanding Lead Actress in a Comedy Series, each of the nominees went up to the stage in the style of a beauty pageant. The orchestra played music similar to that of a pageant as the nominees went to the stage. The winner ended up being Melissa McCarthy, who mentioned that this was "her first and best pageant ever." Both the producers and the nominees in the category gave nominee Amy Poehler credit for conceiving the idea. Nominee Martha Plimpton was also credited.

The presentation was well received critically with many critics regarding it to be the best part of the night. Once all the nominees reached the stage, they received a standing ovation. The pairing of Rob Lowe and Sofía Vergara, who presented the category, was also praised critically.

=== Criticism about the orchestra ===
For the 2011 ceremony, the producers enlisted Hype Music to provide the orchestrations. These orchestrations were universally hated by reviewers. The band played music from the Hype Music roster of artists as the winners walked to the stage, breaking the tradition of their respective program's theme song being played as they accepted their awards. The decision to do this received an overwhelmingly negative response from critics and enraged Emmy Award enthusiasts, many of whom felt as though a tradition observed since the 1st Primetime Emmy Awards had been broken. One reviewer even called this decision "one of the biggest mistakes in the ceremony's history."
