= The Moor (The Borgias) =

- The Borgias episode
- Episode no.: Season 1 Episode 3
- Directed by: Simon Cellan Jones
- Written by: Neil Jordan
- Original air date: April 10, 2011

Guest appearances
- Elyes Gabel as Prince Djem; Augustus Prew as Prince Alfonso; Peter Sullivan as Cardinal Ascanio Sforza; Ronan Vibert as Giovanni Sforza; Gina McKee as Caterina Sforza; Joseph M. Kelly as King Ferrante; Jalaal Hartley as Pinturicchio; Laszlo Konter as Cardinal Colonna

Episode chronology
| ← Previous "The Assassin" | Next → "Lucrezia's Wedding" |

"The Moor" is the third episode of the Showtime-Bravo! series The Borgias. It was written by series creator Neil Jordan and directed by Simon Cellan Jones. It originally aired on April 10, 2011.

The episode deals with Cardinal della Rovere's having fled to the Kingdom of Naples in fear for his life, and in search of support for his plot to depose the Pope. In Rome, the Pope attempts to find a suitable husband for Lucrezia, and takes in a Prince from Constantinople.

== Plot ==
Cardinal Giuliano della Rovere (Colm Feore) arrives in Naples and is given an audience with King Ferrante (Joseph M. Kelly) and Prince Alfonso (Augustus Prew). When the Pope (Jeremy Irons) learns of his arrival in Naples, he asks his son Cesare (François Arnaud) if he knows of someone who could kill the Cardinal. della Rovere and Alfonso discuss deposing the Pope, with della Rovere offering to recognize the independence of Naples (from the claims of Spain and France), should he be elected Pope when Alexander is deposed. Alfonso is not convinced, as he believes Naples is already a proven free kingdom. He takes della Rovere to a dining room, where King Ferrante had his enemies stuffed and put on display, as a warning to anyone who would cross him.

Meanwhile, in Rome, the Pope discusses the Vatican's financial woes with his sons Cesare and Juan (David Oakes). He suggests taking in the marranos, which have recently been exiled from Spain by Queen Isabella, at a high price. While emptying della Rovere's estate, Cesare meets with Micheletto (Sean Harris) and tells him to travel to Naples to assassinate the Cardinal. When Micheletto arrives in Naples, he hides in the dining room among King Ferrante's stuffed enemies until night falls, but before reaching della Rovere's room, he sees two guards posted outside and retreats. Reforming his plan, he attempts to kill della Rovere at a sulphur bath, but is discovered by the Cardinal, recognizing Micheletto's badly scarred back. In Rome, the Pope introduces his 13 new Cardinals in a ceremony at the Vatican. Micheletto barely escapes the baths, and della Rovere is expelled from Naples by Alfonso.

The Pope consults Giulia Farnese (Lotte Verbeek) and Cesare on a request from the Sultan of Constantinople to house his half brother, Prince Cem (Elyes Gabel), for 40,000 ducats a year. In dire need of finances, they decide to accept Djem, even though he is a Muslim. When Djem arrives, he instantly develops a friendship with Lucrezia (Holliday Grainger) and Juan, whom he calls his "Christian brother". While Juan and Lucrezia entertain Djem, the Pope and Cesare begin the search for a husband for Lucrezia. While they have received offers from all over Christendom, the Pope and Cesare agree that to sustain the papacy, her husband must be Italian. While watching Djem and Juan practice swordplay, the Pope reveals to Cesare that the Sultan offered him 400,000 ducats if Djem were to die while in their care. The Pope meets with representatives for several suitors of Lucrezia, but during the meetings, he sees Lucrezia dancing with Djem. He decides that she will be married to Giovanni Sforza (Ronan Vibert), to secure a union with Milan, and to ensure that della Rovere is turned away from Milan on his road to France.

Juan comes to Cesare, in search of Micheletto's services. Cesare quickly deduces that the Pope intends to kill Djem and use the money from the Sultan to pay Lucrezia's dowry. He refuses Juan's request, knowing that Lucrezia loves Djem and would miss him at her wedding. Juan, now unable to use Micheletto, plots with a cook to poison Djem's tea with cantarella. During a small gathering the following day, Djem drinks the poisoned tea, and quickly falls ill, but does not die as Juan expected. After consulting Micheletto, who tells them Djem will be in agony for weeks, Cesare makes Juan finish what he started. Juan enters Djem's room and smothers him with a pillow.

== Reception ==
=== Ratings ===
"The Moor" was watched by 680,000 viewers during its first airing, a drop of almost 400,000 viewers from the week prior.
