= The Cage (The Killing) =

- The Killing episode
- Episode no.: Season 1 Episode 2
- Directed by: Ed Bianchi
- Written by: Veena Sud
- Production code: BDH101/S101
- Original air date: April 3, 2011

Guest appearances
- Kacey Rohl as Sterling Fitch; Garry Chalk as Lieutenant Oakes; Richard Harmon as Jasper Ames; Barclay Hope as Michael Ames; Lee Garlington as Ruth Yitanes

Episode chronology
← Previous "Pilot"	Next → "El Diablo"
- The Killing (season 1)

"The Cage" is the second episode of the American television drama series The Killing, which aired on April 3, 2011, on AMC in the United States after the pilot episode. The episode was written by Veena Sud and was directed by Ed Bianchi. In the episode, police question Rosie Larsen's grieving parents. Rosie's best friend, Sterling, and ex-boyfriend, Jasper, enter the suspect list, which leads the detectives to new evidence found at the school.

== Plot ==
A medical examiner prepares Rosie's body, in order for her parents to view her. As Stan (Brent Sexton) silently identifies his daughter's body, Mitch (Michelle Forbes) turns away and cries. At the police station, Sarah (Mireille Enos) and Holder (Joel Kinnaman) interview the Larsens about the case. Mitch, still in shock, speaks of Rosie's broken fingernails, and Stan describes Rosie as a quiet, family-oriented girl who recently broke up with Jasper Ames. Lieutenant Oakes (Garry Chalk) presents evidence: Rosie's butterfly necklace and a key chain with a bird emblem. Oakes tells Sarah that he needs her for only one more day, asking her to look into the Richmond campaign, adding that campaign car keys were found in the ignition. Sarah urges the Larsens to keep news of Rosie's death to themselves. Stan asks if the detectives will find the killer. Against Sarah's wishes, Holder assures the father.

At Richmond's office, Holder asks direct questions about alibis, in contrast to Sarah's restraint. She requests that Richmond (Billy Campbell) not go public with the campaign's involvement in the case. If mentioned, the killer would realize that Rosie's body had been found. Gwen (Kristin Lehman) and Jamie (Eric Ladin) later encourage Richmond to issue an immediate statement, linking the Larsen tragedy to his own wife's death to generate voter sympathy. Richmond refuses. Alone with Gwen, he confides that someone in the campaign office tipped off a reporter about the Yitanes endorsement via e-mail. He orders an internal investigation.

Holder tells Sarah that the Richmond campaign reported the car stolen on Saturday morning. Since multiple campaign workers used the vehicle, the keys were left in the ignition for convenience. He later questions Sterling (Kasey Rohl), who says she lost track of Rosie at the dance and assumed she was with Jasper. Meanwhile, Jasper (Richard Harmon) brags to Sarah about picking up "some old lady" at a bar on Friday night. He then takes out his cell phone, which Sarah confiscates. He tells her that he and Rosie's relationship was brief. Michael Ames (Barclay Hope), Jasper's father, enters and declares the interview over. Alone with his son, Michael smacks him in the face. Back at the station, Holder considers Jasper as the prime suspect, since Jasper could afford to buy Rosie the expensive designer shoes that Rosie wore to the dance. Oakes adds that Jasper was previously arrested for auto theft.

At City Hall, Gwen informs Richmond that nothing suspicious was found in staff e-mails, and Jamie reports that no staff members are suspects in Rosie's murder. Yitanes (Lee Garlington) enters, demanding to know the secret she's been asked to hear. Sarah arrives, takes Richmond aside, and promises to make him look good, if he stays quiet until midnight, or to look as though he's obstructing a child-murder investigation, if he doesn't. Richmond agrees, then tells Yitanes about smoking marijuana in college. She laughs and leaves. As they campaign door-to-door, Jamie asks Richmond to tell Yitanes about the Larsen situation, but he considers the issue closed. Richmond secretly meets with Nathan (Peter Benson) to ask if he investigated Gwen's and Jamie's e-mail accounts. Told no, Richmond orders him to do so. While driving to the Yitanes endorsement, Richmond receives a call from a reporter requesting confirmation about Rosie and the campaign car.

In a girls' bathroom at the high school, Sarah discovers Rosie's name scratched in a mirror with a line of Xs across it. Smoking outside the school, Holder is approached by two girls who ask if it's marijuana. He offers them a smoke. After he asks about campus party places, one girl mentions a hideaway known as "The Cage." Holder locates the secret room in an abandoned boarded-off area of the school basement. Back at the station, Lieutenant Oakes gives Sarah highlights from the coroner's report. The time of death is unclear, however Rosie was alive when the car hit the water because she ripped off her fingernails trying to claw out. Sarah reminds her boss that she's not staying, but later arrives at The Cage. Holder states that it's where the “real” Halloween party occurred. Sarah surveys the scene, seeing a blood-soaked mattress, a witch's hat like Rosie's, and bloody handprints on the wall.

== Production ==
In an interview with Mina Hochberg at AMCTV.com, Brent Sexton spoke about the difficulty in portraying Stan Larsen: "Stan's the kind of guy that, once he knows it's his daughter and he has his breakdown and rage at the site where they found her, from that point on he's decided to put his family first. He's decided to be the rock for his family and essentially suppresses his own grief. So during the morgue scene, yes, [emotion] definitely wants to come out. However, he won't let it happen."

== Reception ==
Critics paired their reviews with the Pilot episode, but, nonetheless, gave favorable reviews. Teresa L. at TV Fanatic rated the episodes 4.5 out of 5 stars and stated, "This was a great, but long, start to the season. It's an intriguing premise to focus a crime series around a single crime and the effects of that crime and I think it will make for a very entertaining show." The A.V. Club's Meredith Blake rated the first two episodes an A− and commented, "At this early stage, it's hard to know whether The Killing will live up to AMC's aspirations and become The Next Great American Television Show, but, with a mystery this engrossing, who really cares?"

Coupled with the Pilot episode, "The Cage" drew 2.7 million viewers and a 2 household rating.
