= Moguls and Movie Stars =

Television documentary series on the history of American motion pictures

Moguls and Movie Stars is a 2010 Turner Classic Movies 7-part documentary narrated by Christopher Plummer.

== Overview ==
The documentary tells the history of Hollywood pioneers making movies. This documentary features living relatives of Hollywood studio heads and film historians talking about the history of movies. The relatives of the moguls in the documentary include Samuel Goldwyn Jr., son of Samuel Goldwyn, Carla Laemmle, niece of Carl Laemmle, owner of Universal Pictures. This documentary tells the story of Hollywood from the late 19th century-the early 1970s. It starts off as telling the story of the early movie pioneers who came to America and would make a future making movies, the coming of sound movies, World War II, censorship, and Hollywood changing in the 1960s.

== Production ==
The series took three years to make. It was released on November 1, 2010.

== Episodes ==
=== Featured films ===
- The Great Train Robbery (1903)
- The Musketeers of Pig Alley (1912)
- The Birth of a Nation (1915)
- Orphans of the Storm (1921)
- The Phantom of the Opera (1925)
- The Jazz Singer (1927)
- It (1927)
- Coquette (1929)
- Little Caesar (1931)
- The Public Enemy (1931)
- Gold Diggers of 1933 (1933)
- Footlight Parade (1933)
- Dames (1934)
- Top Hat (1935)
- Gone with the Wind (1939)
- The Great Dictator (1941)
- Singin' in the Rain (1952)
- Blackboard Jungle (1955)
- The Defiant Ones (1958)
- Cleopatra (1963)
- Bonnie and Clyde (1967)
- Guess Who's Coming to Dinner (1967)

=== Featured actors ===
==== 1910s ====
- Charles Chaplin – actor, famous from 1914–early 1940s
- Douglas Fairbanks – actor, famous from the mid-1910s–late 1920s
- Francis X. Bushman – actor, famous from early 1910s–late 1920s
- Mabel Normand – actor, famous from early 1910s–early 1920s
- Fatty Arbuckle – actor, famous from early 1910s–early 1920s
- Gloria Swanson – actor, famous from early 1910s–1920s
- Cecil B. Demille – producer, famous from late 1910s–late 1950s
- Lillian Gish – actor, famous from early 1910s–early 1930s

==== 1920s ====
- Rudolph Valentino – actor, famous from 1921–until his death in 1926
- Buster Keaton – actor, famous from 1920–early 1930s
- Claudette Colbert – actor, famous from the late 1920s–late 1940s
- Norma Shearer – actress, famous from the mid-1920s–1942, when she retired
- Greta Garbo – actress, famous from the late 1920s–1941, when she retired

==== 1930s ====
- Jean Harlow – actress
- Bing Crosby – actor, singer
- Al Jolson – actor, singer
- Ruby Keeler – actress, singer, dancer
- Joan Blondell – actress
- Melvyn Douglas – actor
- Fred MacMurray – actor, famous from the late 1930s–late 1960s
- Cary Grant – actor, famous from the late 1930s–1966, when retired
- Clark Gable – actor, famous from the early 1930s–his death in 1960
- John Wayne – actor, famous from 1939–his death in 1979
- Spencer Tracy – actor, famous from the 1930s–his death in 1967
- Frank Capra – producer, famous from the early 1930s–late 1950s
- Edward G. Robinson –
- James Cagney –
- William Holden

==== 1940s ====
- Gene Tierney – actress, famous from early 1940s–mid-1950s
- Natalie Wood – actress, famous from late 1940s–her death in 1981
- Humphrey Bogart – actor, famous from 1941–his death in 1957
- Lauren Bacall – actress, famous from 1944–1960s
- William Holden – actor, famous from 1939–mid-1970s
- Elizabeth Taylor – actress, famous from late 1940s–early 1970s
- Lana Turner – actress, famous from early 1940s–late 1960s
- Vincent Price – actor, famous from early 1940s–late 1950s
- Cyd Charisse – actress, famous from late 1940s–early 1960s
- Gregory Peck – actor, famous from mid-1940s–early 1970s
- Cornel Wilde – actor, famous from early 1940s–late 1950s
- Lucille Ball – actress, famous from mid-1940s–early 1970s
- Errol Flynn-actor, famous late 1930s-1940s

==== 1950s ====
- Marilyn Monroe – actress, famous from early 1950s–her death in 1962
- Marlon Brando – actor, famous from early 1950s–until his death in 2004
- Debbie Reynolds – actress, famous from early 1950s–early 1980s
- Shirley MacLaine – actress, famous from 1950s–and still appears today in movies
- James Dean – actor, famous from 1953–until his death in 1955
- Audrey Hepburn – actress, famous from early 1950s–late 1970s
- Jane Russell, actress, famous from late 1940s–late 1950s
- Jack Lemmon, actor, famous from early 1950s–early 1990s

==== 1960s ====
- Dustin Hoffman – actor, famous from late 1960s–early 1990s
- Robert Redford – actor, famous from late 1960s–early 1990s
- Peter Sellers – actor, famous from early 1960s–until his death in 1980
- Anne Bancroft – actress, famous in the 1960s–1970s
- Warren Beatty – actor, famous from late 1960s–early 1990s

==== 1970s ====
- Jack Nicholson – actor

=== Featured moguls ===
Name	Year of birth	Studio
Jack L. Warner	1892	Warner Brothers
Louis B. Mayer	1884	MGM
Carl Laemmle	1867	Universal Pictures
Samuel Goldwyn	1879	MGM
Darryl F. Zanuck	1902	Twentieth Century Fox
William Fox	1879	Fox Movie Corporation

=== Episodes ===
- "Peepshow Pioneers" (November 1, 2010)
- "The Birth of Hollywood" (November 8, 2010)
- "The Dream Merchants" (November 15, 2010)
- "Brother, Can You Spare A Dream?" (November 22, 2010)
- "Warriors and Peacemakers" (November 29, 2010)
- "Attack of the Small Screens" (December 6, 2010)
- "Fade Out, Fade In" (December 13, 2010)

== Accolades ==
The mini-series was nominated for three Primetime Emmy Awards, including Outstanding Nonfiction Series, Outstanding Writing for Nonfiction Programming, and Outstanding Voice-over Performance for Christopher Plummer's narration.
