= Patty Jenkins =

American film director (born 1971)

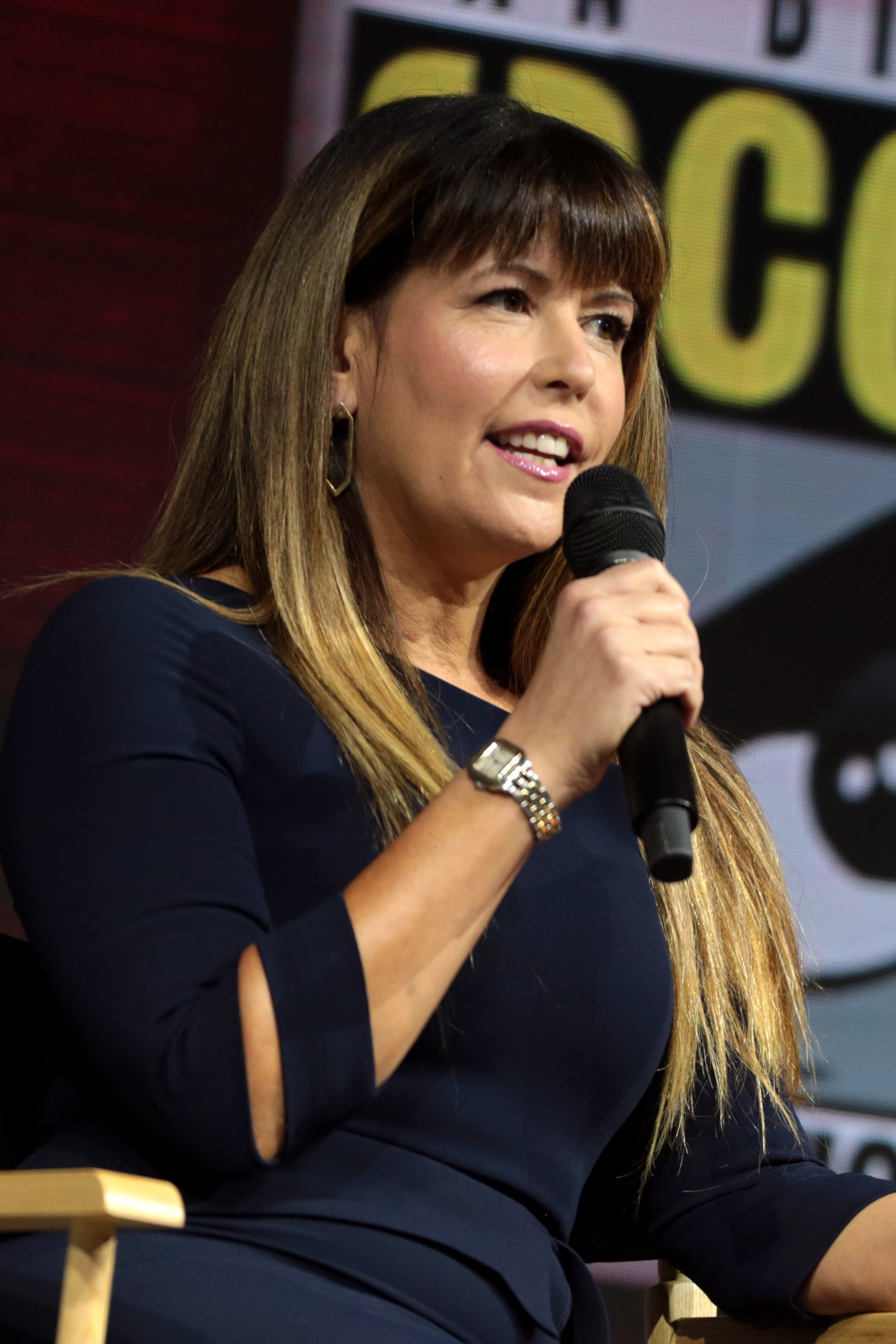
- Jenkins at the 2018 San Diego Comic-Con
- Born: Patricia Lea Jenkins; July 24, 1971 (age 55); Victorville, California, U.S.
- Education: Cooper Union (BFA); AFI Conservatory (MFA)
- Occupations: Film director; screenwriter; film producer
- Years active: 1995–present
- Spouse: Sam Sheridan (m. 2007)
- Children: 1

Patricia Lea Jenkins (born July 24, 1971) is an American film director, screenwriter, and producer. She has directed the feature films Monster (2003), Wonder Woman (2017), and Wonder Woman 1984 (2020).

For the film Monster, she won the Independent Spirit Award for Best First Feature and the Franklin J. Schaffner Award of the American Film Institute (AFI). For the pilot episode of the series The Killing (2011), she received a Primetime Emmy Award nomination and the Directors Guild of America award for Best Directing in a Drama Series. In 2017, she occupied the seventh place for Time's Person of the Year. Her salary negotiations with Warner Bros. to direct the Wonder Woman films became a widely discussed moment in Hollywood’s ongoing conversation about pay equity. Jenkins's ability to secure a salary equal to male directors of similar-budget tentpoles was viewed as a landmark moment for women in the industry.

== Early life ==
Jenkins was born in Victorville, California, to William T. Jenkins, a U.S. Air Force officer and fighter pilot who earned a Silver Star in the Vietnam War, and Emily Roth, who later worked in San Francisco as an environmental scientist. Her older sister is Elaine Roth, her younger sister is Jessica Jenkins Murphy.

She spent her early childhood moving frequently due to her father's military service. Having lived briefly in Thailand and Germany, the family eventually settled in Lawrence, Kansas. When she was seven years old, her father died during a NATO mock dogfight at the age of 31. During a road trip from Kansas to San Francisco, her mother dropped Jenkins and her sister off at a movie theater, where they watched the original Superman starring Christopher Reeve. Jenkins found the film inspiring, and the experience sparked an interest in pursuing filmmaking as a career.

She completed kindergarten through her junior year of high school while living in Lawrence. Her mother then moved the family to Washington, D.C., where Patty completed her senior year of high school. She received her undergraduate degree in painting from The Cooper Union for the Advancement of Science and Art in 1993, and a master's degree in directing from the American Film Institute's AFI Conservatory in 2000. While a student at AFI, Jenkins, an avid fan of the films of Pedro Almodóvar, made the 2001 short film Velocity Rules, that she describes as a cross between a superhero film and Almodóvar's tone about an accident-prone housewife.

Beginning in junior high school, Jenkins took interest in painting, photography, and screen-printing. At age 20, while interning at a commercial production company, she heeded a suggestion that she could receive film training if she worked on set for free. After doing so for some months, Jenkins advanced to second assistant camera and focus puller, then spent eight years as a camerawoman. While shooting a Michael Jackson music video, her director of photography recommended that she attend the American Film Institute to learn directing. She later made a superhero short film that played at AFI Fest. There she met Brad Wyman, who later introduced her to producer Donald Kushner, leading to her directing her first feature film, Monster (2003).

== Career ==
=== 2001–2014: Monster success and TV projects ===
Jenkins started her career with Just Drives (2001) as her first film as director, she would later follow it up with Velocity Rules. This film follows a housewife who finds out she is a superhero and then has to choose between a life of excitement and glamour or her husband. The film ended up being a Recipient of the Warner Brothers Production Grant. These early short films helped Jenkins gain attention for her distinctive blend of grounded character work and genre elements. Despite being student-level projects, they circulated at festivals and helped her build professional connections that would later prove essential for financing larger projects.

This ended up moving her towards the film Monster (2003); at first she tried to get producer Brad Wyman to direct, but under his advice she ended up writing the script herself. Jenkins ended up writing to the film's subject, serial killer Aileen Wuornos, who was a street prostitute who went on a 1989–1990 murder spree of seven of her male clients, and was at the time on death row. Wuornos was initially distrustful of Jenkins but on the night before her execution, left Jenkins all of her personal letters which convinced Jenkins that she was the only one who could direct the film. Jenkins has said in interviews that this exchange with Wuornos shaped the emotional honesty of the film and deeply influenced her commitment to telling stories about complicated, often misunderstood women. She spent months researching Wuornos’s life, speaking with people who knew her and visiting Florida locations tied to the real case.

With a budget of $1.5 million and Charlize Theron attached to the film, Monster ended up being a commercial and critical success, grossing $64.2 million and earning Theron her first and only Oscar to date for Best Actress in a Leading Role. Noted film critic Roger Ebert ranked Monster 1st on his list of the best films of 2003 and later in 2009, ranked it 3rd on the list of the best films of the decade. For this film, Jenkins won the Independent Spirit Award for Best First Feature and the Franklin J. Schaffner Award of the American Film Institute (an award for outstanding graduates of the AFI Conservatory), and also was nominated for the Edgar Allan Poe Award for Best Screenplay. Theron's physical and emotional transformation in the film is often credited to Jenkins's collaborative directing style. Jenkins encouraged Theron to explore the psychology of Wuornos rather than mimic her surface behavior, which many critics later cited as a major reason the performance resonated so deeply.

After the success of Monster, Jenkins was approached by former United States Air Force test pilot Chuck Yeager to develop a film about his life. When that project did not reach fruition, she attempted to make a Ryan Gosling film titled I Am Superman, a film with no relation to the DC Comics character, but development ended when she became pregnant. Jenkins spent the next decade working in television. During this period, although many studios offered Jenkins crime dramas or biopics similar in tone to Monster, she turned down several projects because she wanted to avoid being typecast. She has publicly discussed how difficult it was for female directors—particularly those who made character-driven films—to secure funding for larger feature projects in the mid-2000s.

In 2011, she directed one segment in the made-for-television anthology film Five. Jenkins received an Emmy nomination because of her work on the film. Jenkins directed many commercials and TV shows, like episodes of Arrested Development and Entourage. She received an Emmy nomination again, for directing AMC's The Killing pilot. In October 2011, at the request of actress Natalie Portman, she was hired by Marvel Studios to direct Thor: The Dark World, the first sequel to the 2011 superhero film Thor. Jenkins intended for the film to be a "Romeo-and-Juliet-style space epic" that focused on the romance between Thor and Jane Foster, but left the project after less than two months due to creative differences with Marvel Entertainment's "Creative Committee" as led by Alan Fine, which argued that her take would potentially be unable to drive toy sales. Jenkins's departure from Thor became a high-profile example of female directors facing creative limitations within major franchises, an issue she has since spoken about frequently. In 2014, she was attached to Sweetheart, a film about a female assassin, but that film was never made.

=== 2015–present: Breakthrough and worldwide fame ===
In 2015, Jenkins signed on as director for the DC Extended Universe film Wonder Woman, with a screenplay by Allan Heinberg and a story co-written by Heinberg, Zack Snyder and Jason Fuchs, and starring Gal Gadot. Heinberg's script was rewritten and completed by Jenkins and Geoff Johns, who were left out of the official credits by the WGA. With this film, Jenkins also became the first female director of an American studio superhero film, and the third female director to direct a film with a budget over $100 million. The film was acclaimed by both critics and audiences and grossed over $800 million worldwide, exceeding box office original predictions. Wonder Woman eventually became the highest-grossing film directed by a woman, surpassing previous record holder Mamma Mia! by Phyllida Lloyd. However, in 2019, Frozen II directed by Jennifer Lee (with Chris Buck) and Captain Marvel, directed by Anna Boden (with Ryan Fleck) became number one and two respectively, dropping Wonder Woman and Jenkins to number three. Many industry analysts credited Jenkins with reshaping the perception of female-led superhero films, as earlier attempts from other studios had struggled critically or commercially. The film also became a cultural touchstone, particularly for audiences seeking female empowerment narratives within blockbuster cinema.

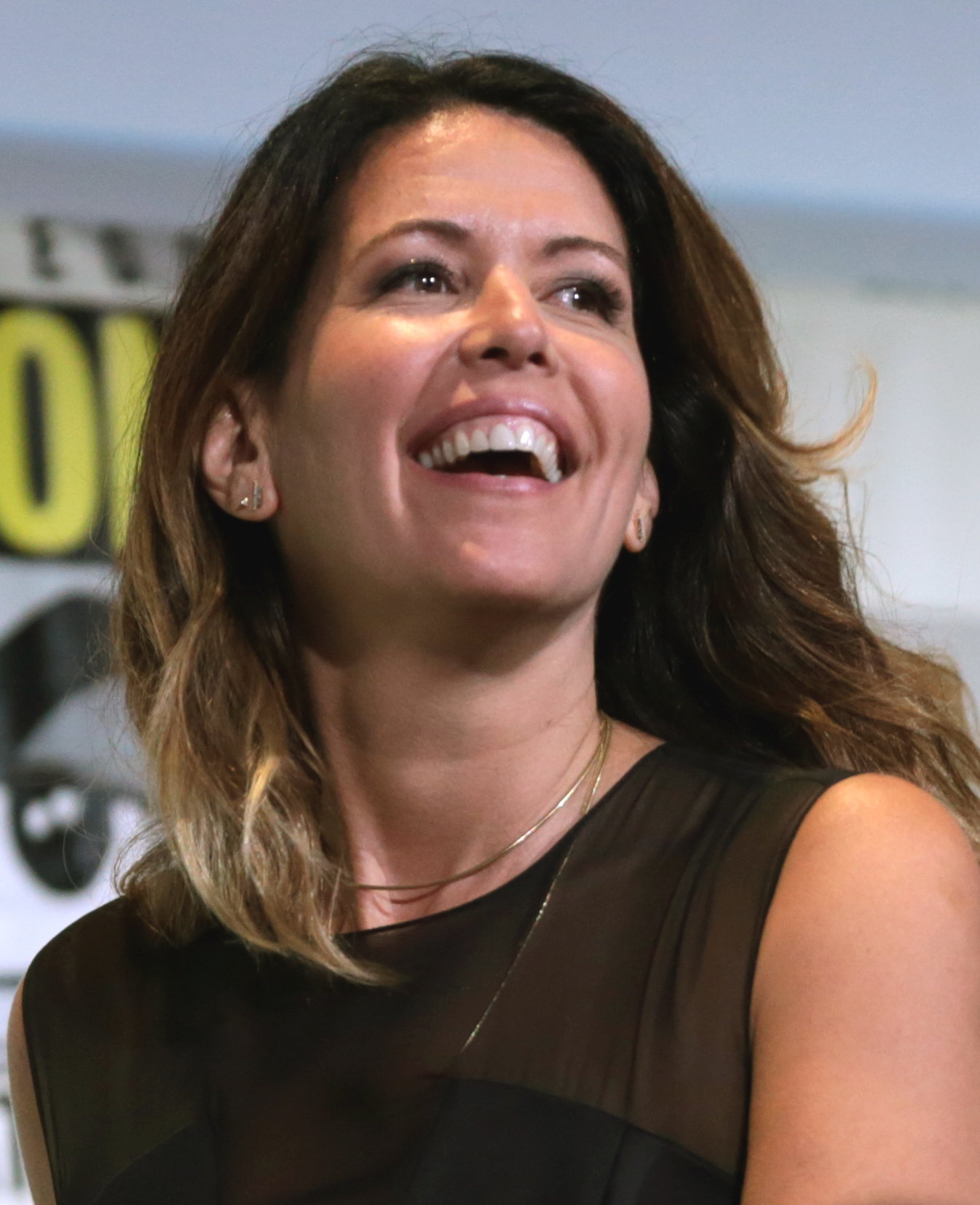
Jenkins at the 2016 San Diego Comic-Con

While promoting Wonder Woman, Jenkins mentioned that her next project would likely be a limited television series developed with her husband. This project was later revealed as a horror series titled Riprore, to premiere on the video-on-demand service Shudder. In July 2017, the cable network TNT announced Jenkins would direct the premiere of a six-episode television drama, I Am the Night, written by her husband Sam Sheridan, and featuring her Wonder Woman star Chris Pine. She additionally served as executive producer. Jenkins's work on I Am the Night allowed her to explore darker visual storytelling again, returning to some of the stylistic approaches she had used in Monster, but within the framework of prestige television.

In September 2017, Variety reported Jenkins would return to direct Wonder Woman 2 (which was later retitled as Wonder Woman 1984). However, on MTV's "Happy, Sad, Confused" podcast, Jenkins revealed that she considered walking away from the sequel due to salary dispute between her and Warner Bros. On December 6, 2017, Jenkins was named by Time as the seventh runner-up for Time Person of the Year.

Wonder Woman 1984 was scheduled to be released by Warner Bros. Pictures in the United States on June 5, 2020, but, due to the COVID-19 pandemic, the release was delayed until December 25, 2020. It had originally been scheduled for November 1, 2019. Unlike the first film, the sequel received a mixed critical reception and was a box office failure. She has been negotiating the terms of her contract with Warner Brothers for an estimated seven to nine million dollars, which would be a record breaking salary for a female filmmaker. She signed on to the first film with no guarantee of directing a second film, but envisioned the second one during the making of Wonder Woman, which turned out to benefit her greatly. When she had signed on to do the second film, she had the ability to get a much higher salary than she would have if she had been signed on to do both films from the beginning. Her goal with her negotiations were to make sure she would get the same salary that her male counterparts would be getting for doing this movie and she seems to have succeeded. Despite the mixed reception, Jenkins continued to defend the film as a stylistic homage to 1980s superhero media, emphasizing that it was intentionally lighter and more idealistic than the first installment.

In October 2020, it was revealed that Gadot and Jenkins will be teaming up again for the film Cleopatra. The film will star Gadot as the titular Cleopatra, the historical pharaoh of ancient Egypt, with Jenkins as the director. In December 2021, Jenkins dropped out of the film, but remained as a producer, to instead focus on a third Wonder Woman film and Rogue Squadron. Industry insiders suggested that scheduling conflicts and creative disagreements also contributed to Jenkins's departure, although all parties maintained a positive public stance.

In November 2020, a spin off film set in the Wonder Woman universe focusing on the Amazons of Themyscira was confirmed to be in early development. Jenkins will not return to direct the film, but cowrote the script with Geoff Johns. In 2021, Warner Bros. announced a third installment of the Wonder Woman franchise with Jenkins attached to write and direct. However, in December 2022, it was reported by The Hollywood Reporter that Jenkins's third film would not be moving forward after all and was considered to be "dead in its current incarnation", as the film did not fit with the newly appointed DC Studios heads' plans for the DC Extended Universe or its upcoming successor, the DC Universe. Jenkins later released a public statement clarifying that she had been willing to revise her treatment for the third film but that the studio ultimately chose a different direction for the franchise.

In December 2020, Disney announced that Jenkins was hired to direct a Star Wars spin-off film titled Rogue Squadron, inspired by the group of starfighter pilots of the same name. The film was originally scheduled to be released on December 22, 2023. Jenkins would be the first female director to helm a Star Wars film, but not the first female director within the overall franchise. In June 2021, The Hollywood Reporter reported that Matthew Robinson had been hired by Lucasfilm to write the script. In November 2021, it was reported that the film's production had been delayed due to scheduling conflicts with other projects Jenkins was developing. In September 2022, Disney removed Rogue Squadron from their release schedule and the film was then shelved in March 2023. In March 2024, Jenkins revealed that following the cancellation of the third Wonder Woman film, she had returned to Rogue Squadron, finalizing a deal with Lucasfilm prior to the 2023 Writers Guild of America strike, and that she now "owes" a new draft of the script. Jenkins emphasized in later interviews that Rogue Squadron remains one of her passion projects, citing her father’s military aviation background as a major source of inspiration. The film’s development continues to be closely watched as Lucasfilm reassesses its theatrical strategy.

In late 2024, it was announced that Jenkins, Jake Kasdan and Joe Cornish would each direct a live-action film for the Lego Group and Universal Pictures. Jenkins wrote the script for her film script together with Johns and will also produce the film through her company Wicious Pictures.

=== Other work ===
Jenkins, Wonder Woman actresses Gadot and Lynda Carter, DC Entertainment President Diane Nelson and U.N. Under-Secretary General Cristina Gallach appeared at the United Nations on October 21, 2016, the 75th anniversary of the first appearance of Wonder Woman, to mark the character's designation by the United Nations as its "Honorary Ambassador for the Empowerment of Women and Girls". The gesture was intended to raise awareness of UN Sustainable Development Goal No. 5, which seeks to achieve gender equality and empower all women and girls by 2030. The decision was met with protests from UN staff members who stated in their petition to UN Secretary-General Ban Ki-moon that the character is "not culturally encompassing or sensitive", and served to objectify women. As a result, the character was stripped of the designation, and the project ended December 16.

== Style and themes ==
In the film Monster, Jenkins explored the issues of morality and femininity. In Wonder Woman, Jenkins suggests that the audience experiences the journey of the lead character Diana Prince through Diana's eyes. Diana is portrayed as the universal human character that the audience never experiences from the outside. Jenkins suggests that the major theme of the film is the idea that there are no other villains than humans themselves. She mentions how she was influenced by Superman and how that is incorporated in her own superhero film.

Connie Nielsen, who plays Hippolyta in the Wonder Woman franchise, said that Jenkins fought for feminist themes to be included in Wonder Woman, and rejected the idea of including a controversial origin story for the Amazons, which portrayed them as victims rather than warriors.

== Personal life ==
In 2007, Jenkins married Sam Sheridan, a former firefighter and the author of the book A Fighter's Heart. After she gave birth to their son, Jenkins delayed her return to feature filmmaking, and Wonder Woman was her second feature. As of 2017, they reside in Santa Monica, California.

== Filmography ==
Key
†	Denotes films that have not yet been released

Feature film

Year	Title	Director	Writer	Producer	Notes
2003	Monster	Yes	Yes	No	
2017	Wonder Woman	Yes	Uncredited	No	
2020	Wonder Woman 1984	Yes	Yes	Yes	
2023	Poolman	No	No	Yes	
2025	Junkie	No	No	Executive	

Short film

Year	Title	Director	Writer	Executive producer
2001	Just Drive	Yes	Yes	No
2001	Velocity Rules	Yes	Yes	No
2017	Epilogue: Etta's Mission	Yes	No	No
2024	Tea	No	No	Yes
2025	What's the Deal with Birds?	No	No	Yes

Television

Year	Title	Director	Executive producer	Notes
2004	Arrested Development	Yes	No	Episode "The One Where They Build a House"
2006	Entourage	Yes	No	Episodes "Crash and Burn" and "The Release"
2011	Five	Yes	No	Television film; segment "Pearl"
2011–2012	The Killing	Yes	No	Episodes "Pilot" and "What I Know"
2013	Betrayal	Yes	Yes	Episode "Pilot"
2015	Exposed	Yes	Yes	Unaired pilot
2019	I Am the Night	Yes	Yes	Episodes "Pilot" and "Phenomenon of Interference"

Acting credits

Year	Title	Role	Episode
2008	The Sarah Silverman Program	Jill Talley	"Fetus Don't Fail Me Now"
2020	Impractical Jokers: Dinner Party	Herself	"The 4 Meals, 1 Color Episode"

== Accolades ==
In 2004, for her work on Monster, she won the Independent Spirit Award for Best First Feature and the Franklin J. Schaffner Award of the American Film Institute (an award for outstanding graduates of the AFI Conservatory). In 2011, Jenkins received an Emmy nomination for Outstanding Directing for a Drama Series for the pilot of The Killing. She received two nominations at the 2012 Directors Guild of America Awards for Outstanding Directorial Achievement, one for Dramatic Series for The Killing and the other for Movies for Television/Mini-Series for Five; she won the former.

Year	Award	Category	Nominee	Result
2001	Telluride Indiefest	Short Film Winner	Velocity Rules	Won
2004	American Film Institute	Top Ten Films of the Year	Monster	Won
2004	American Film Institute	Franklin J. Schaffner Award Recipient	Herself	Won
2004	Berlin International Film Festival	Golden Bear Award	Monster	Nominated
2004	Edgar Allan Poe Awards	Best Motion Picture Screenplay	Monster	Nominated
2004	Independent Spirit Awards	Best First Feature	Monster	Won
2004	Independent Spirit Awards	Best First Screenplay	Monster	Nominated
2004	Iowa Film Critics Awards	Best Movie Yet to Open in Iowa	Monster	Won
2004	Las Vegas Film Critics Society Awards	Best Screenplay	Monster	Nominated
2005	GLAAD Media Awards	Outstanding Film – Wide Release	Monster	Nominated
2005	Robert Awards	Best American Film	Monster	Nominated
2011	Primetime Emmy Awards	Outstanding Directing for a Drama Series	The Killing (episode "Pilot")	Nominated
2011	LA Femme International Film Festival	Visionary Award	Herself	Won
2012	Directors Guild of America Awards	Outstanding Directorial Achievement in Dramatic Series	The Killing (episode "Pilot")	Won
2012	Directors Guild of America Awards	Outstanding Directorial Achievement in Movies for Television/Mini-Series	Five	Nominated
2017	Chicago Indie Critics Awards	Impact Award	Wonder Woman	Won
2017	Philadelphia Film Critics Circle Awards	Steve Friedman Award	Wonder Woman	Won
2017	Rondo Hatton Classic Horror Awards	Best Film	Wonder Woman	Nominated
2018	Saturn Awards	Best Director	Wonder Woman	Nominated
2018	EDA Female Focus Awards	Best Woman Director	Wonder Woman	Nominated
2018	EDA Female Focus Awards	Outstanding Achievement by a Woman in the Film Industry	Wonder Woman	Nominated
2018	Cannes Film Festival	Kering Women in Motion Award Recipient	Herself	Won
2018	Empire Awards	Best Director	Wonder Woman	Nominated
2018	Dorian Awards	Wilde Artist of the Year	Herself	Nominated
2018	Hugo Awards	Best Dramatic Presentation – Long Form	Wonder Woman	Won
2018	National Board of Review Awards	Spotlight Award (Shared with Gal Gadot)	Wonder Woman	Won
2018	North Texas Film Critics Association	Best Director	Wonder Woman	Nominated
2020	IGN Awards	Best Movie of the Year	Wonder Woman 1984	Nominated
2020	IGN Awards	Best Sci-Fi/Fantasy Movie	Wonder Woman 1984	Nominated
2020	EntreNews Awards	Best Director	Wonder Woman 1984	Won
2020	EntreNews Awards	Best Film	Wonder Woman 1984	Won
2020	Rondo Hatton Classic Horror Awards	Best Film	Wonder Woman 1984	Won
2020	Golden Issue Awards	Best Director	Wonder Woman 1984	Nominated
2020	Golden Issue Awards	Best Movie	Wonder Woman 1984	Nominated
2021	Hollywood Critics Association Awards	Best Blockbuster Film	Wonder Woman 1984	Nominated
2021	Kids Choice Awards	Favorite Movie	Wonder Woman 1984	Won
2021	Jupiter Award	Best International Film	Wonder Woman 1984	Won
2021	Cape & Castle Awards	Best Superhero Movie of the Year	Wonder Woman 1984	Won
2021	Cape & Castle Awards	Best Movie of the Year	Wonder Woman 1984	Won
2021	Series Em Cena Awards	Best Movie of the Year	Wonder Woman 1984	Won
2021	Dragon Awards	Best Sci-Fi/Fantasy Movie	Wonder Woman 1984	Nominated
2022	Comic Book Film Awards	Best Writing	Wonder Woman 1984	Nominated
2022	Comic Book Film Awards	Best Director	Wonder Woman 1984	Nominated
2022	Comic Book Film Awards	Best Comic Book Film	Wonder Woman 1984	Nominated

== See also ==
- List of female film and television directors
