= Pilot (The Killing) =

- The Killing episode
- Episode no.: Season 1 Episode 1
- Directed by: Patty Jenkins
- Teleplay by: Veena Sud
- Production code: BDH179/S179
- Original air date: April 3, 2011

Guest appearances
- Callum Keith Rennie as Rick Felder; Tom Butler as Mayor Lesley Adams; Katie Findlay as Rosie Larsen; Kacey Rohl as Sterling Fitch; Garry Chalk as Lieutenant Michael Oakes; Brandon Jay McLaren as Bennet Ahmed; Richard Harmon as Jasper Ames

Episode chronology
← Previous —	Next → "The Cage"
- The Killing (season 1)

"Pilot" is the pilot and first episode of the American television drama series The Killing, which premiered on April 3, 2011 on AMC in the United States. The series is based on the Danish television series Forbrydelsen (The Crime) and developed for American audiences by Veena Sud. The episode's teleplay was written by Sud and was directed by Patty Jenkins. In the episode, police detective Sarah Linden plans to retire but is asked to investigate the disappearance of Rosie Larsen, a young girl.

== Plot ==
Sarah Linden (Mireille Enos) takes her morning jog along a park's jogging path. Her scenes are inter-cut with a night-time flashback of a teenage girl (Katie Findlay) frantically racing through the woods. The girl is being chased by someone with a flashlight and they find her. The morning jog is cut short when Sarah receives a phone call. She rushes to a crime scene, where a bloody trail leads her to a surprise going-away party thrown by co-workers. It is Sarah's last day as a Seattle, Washington homicide detective. At the police station, Sarah packs her personal items and meets her replacement, Stephen Holder (Joel Kinnaman). Her boss, Lieutenant Oakes (Garry Chalk), gives her one last assignment, assuring it will be her last, and tells her to bring along Holder. On the way to the crime scene, Holder relates his previous work as a narc for the county police. At the crime scene, they are shown what evidence that has been discovered thus far: a bloody pink sweater and Stanley Larsen's ATM card. No body has been found, so Sarah decides that the sex crimes unit should instead be investigating. Holder argues that the Larsen name should be checked out, promising Linden that they'll be done in time for her to catch her flight.

Stan Larsen (Brent Sexton) stops by his home while working to fix a dishwasher that is constantly breaking. His wife, Mitch (Michelle Forbes), again mentions their daughter Rosie's plans to attend college out of state. The mother is for the idea, the father against it. Sarah and Holder later arrive at the Larsen home, where Mitch says that she and her husband spent the weekend camping out of cell-phone range. After noticing a pink bicycle in their garage, Sarah asks Mitch if she has a daughter. Mitch tells Sarah and Holder that Rosie went to a Halloween dance on Friday. Rosie had told her that "only freshmen wore costumes" and wore a pink sweater. After taking a call from the school, Mitch learns that Rosie wasn't with her best friend, Sterling (Kacey Rohl), over the weekend and hasn't been seen since the dance. While Mitch is on the phone, Sarah peeks into Rosie's room, which is decorated with a butterfly theme.

Meanwhile, Darren Richmond (Billy Campbell), a Seattle city councilman and mayoral candidate, visits an outdoor mausoleum. Later, upon arriving at City Hall, he announces to campaign manager Jamie Wright (Eric Ladin) and lead advisor Gwen Eaton (Kristin Lehman) that Councilwoman Ruth Yitanes will endorse him, which could seal an election victory. At Fort Washington High, Richmond and his rival, mayor Lesley Adams (Tom Butler), are about to address a student assembly. Sarah arrives and suggests canceling the assembly, to allow the police to investigate Rosie's disappearance. Richmond agrees, angering Adams. At campaign headquarters, Jamie urges Richmond to take advantage of Rosie's disappearance, but the candidate refuses to cooperate. After hearing that Adams knew about Yitanes' endorsement, Richmond asks Jamie and Gwen if a staff member is leaking information. Not long after, he receives a phone call regarding a reporter's inquiries into a rendezvous that only few people on his staff know about.

At their apartment, Stan asks Mitch about Jasper Ames, who has been involved with Rosie. Mitch tells him that Jasper and Rosie had broken up. Stan later confronts Sterling, who tells him that Rosie is with Jasper. Stan calls Mitch with the news. Oakes calls Sarah to tell her that Rosie has been found at Jasper's and halts the investigation. Sarah is skeptical, since no one has spoken directly to Rosie, and stays at the crime scene. However, the reported burial site uncovers only a doll and she leaves the site. While preparing to leave the crime scene, Sarah sees three people with fishing poles walking along a fire road and wonders where they're headed. Holder offers a map showing a lake nearby. As night falls, a crane hoists a black car out of the lake.

Stan bursts into the Ames' weekend home. Jasper (Richard Harmon) protests, but Stan charges into the bedroom, only to find a middle-aged woman (Leanna Merrett) in the bed. Stan calls Mitch to tell her that Rosie wasn't at Jasper's house and that he's now heading to Discovery Park, where the pink sweater was found. With Mitch still on the phone, he approaches two police vehicles blocking the road. He's too far away to see anything, when Sarah has the retrieved car's trunk popped. The body of a teenage girl is found inside. Sarah approaches to tell Stan, but her face confirms his suspicion that Rosie is dead. He screams, as Mitch listens helplessly on the phone. Holder informs Sarah that they checked the plates on the car, which belongs to the Richmond campaign. As police photograph the body in the trunk, Sarah notices the girl is wearing a butterfly necklace.

== Production ==
In an interview with Mina Hochberg at AMCTV.com, episode director Patty Jenkins stated this about the choice to not be too graphic when revealing Rosie's body in the trunk: "I think there were some fears that people would want more graphic detail out of it, but that moment never happened. That [might have been] a dealbreaker for me. I felt like we needed to do the bare minimum to get the point across, not to revel in details. If it had crossed that line I would have been very uncomfortable, and I think everybody would have been very uncomfortable. It's always about what's necessary to tell the story you're telling. This is not a story of sensationalism. This is an emotionally-based story, so that was all we needed and wanted."

== Reception ==
=== Critical reception ===
The series premiere received universal acclaim from critics. Tim Goodman of The Hollywood Reporter gave the series a very positive review, calling it "excellent, absorbing and addictive. When each episode ends, you long for the next — a hallmark of great dramas." Goodman also praised Mireille Enos's performance as the lead character Sarah, saying "It's not until you watch Enos play Sarah for a while that it sinks in — there hasn't been a female American character like her probably ever." Entertainment Weekly's Ken Tucker gave it a B+, saying "The acting is strikingly good" and that "Some viewers may find The Killing a little too cold and deliberate, but give it time. Its intensity builds steadily, giving the series unexpected power." Alex Strachan of The Vancouver Sun says the series "is soaked in atmosphere and steeped in the stark realism of Scandinavian crime novelists Henning Mankell and Stieg Larsson" and that it "is not as much about a young girl's murder as it is a psychological study of what happens afterward, how a tight-knit community tries to recover and how a dead child's mother, father and siblings learn to deal with their pain in their own private ways." Matt Roush of TV Guide applauded the series, calling the acting "tremendous" and that he "was instantly hooked by the moody atmosphere of this season-long murder mystery set in Seattle." He went on to say "What really stands out for me, in this age of cookie-cutter procedurals, is how The Killing dramatizes the devastation a violent death has on a family, a community, on the people involved in the investigation. Nothing about this show is routine."

=== Ratings ===
When it premiered, the pilot episode was AMC's second-highest original series premiere following The Walking Dead. The premiere drew 2.7 million viewers and a 2 household rating. The two encores of the premiere episode brought the ratings of the premiere up to a total of 4.6 million total viewers and a 3.7 household rating. The UK premiere on Channel 4 brought in 2.2 million viewers.

=== Awards and nominations ===
The episode received three Emmy Award nominations for the 63rd Primetime Emmy Awards — Veena Sud for Outstanding Writing for a Drama Series, Patty Jenkins for Outstanding Directing for a Drama Series, and Elizabeth Kling for Outstanding Single-Camera Picture Editing for a Drama Series. Jenkins won the 2012 Directors Guild of America Award for Outstanding Directorial Achievement in Dramatic Series.
