= The Assassin (The Borgias) =

- The Borgias episode
- Episode no.: Season 1 Episode 2
- Directed by: Neil Jordan
- Written by: Neil Jordan
- Original air date: April 3, 2011

Guest appearances
- Peter Sullivan as Ascanio Sforza; Stephen Noonan as the Deacon Cardinal; Vernon Dobtcheff as Cardinal Julius Versucci; Bosco Hogan as Cardinal Piccolomini; Laszlo Konter as Cardinal Colonna; David Lowe as the French Ambassador

Episode chronology
← Previous "The Poisoned Chalice"	Next → "The Moor"

"The Assassin" is the second episode of the Showtime-Bravo! series The Borgias. It was written and directed by series creator Neil Jordan and originally aired on April 3, 2011, as the second half of a 2-hour premiere.

The episode deals with the aftermath and investigation into the murder of Cardinal Orsini, and the beginning of Cardinal della Rovere's plot to depose Alexander VI.

== Plot ==
Immediately following the murder of Cardinal Orsini, Micheletto (Sean Harris) informs Cesare (François Arnaud) that there is also a plot against his family. They arrive at Cesare's home to save his mother and sister, Vannozza (Joanne Whalley) and Lucrezia (Holliday Grainger). Juan (David Oakes) arrives at the palace of Cardinal Orsini and directs his soldiers to arrest Orsini's household staff. Later, Cesare meets with his father, the Pope (Jeremy Irons) and Cardinal della Rovere (Colm Feore), who tells them Orsini was killed by poison. Soon after, Juan brings Micheletto into the room, having arrested him outside the gates. The Pope recognizes him as one of the servants pouring wine during the dinner, and Juan orders he be tortured for information. Before Juan can begin his interrogation, Cesare tells him that he will do it instead. Cesare tells Micheletto that he will release him, and to spy on Cardinal della Rovere.

After briefly torturing Micheletto, Cesare discusses Orsini's murder with the Pope. Alexander tells Cesare that he is being made a Cardinal, and Cesare begs him to reconsider, and give him control of the Papal armies, but is denied again in favour of Juan. In addition, Alexander tells Cesare that he intends to find a husband for Lucrezia, in order to make an ally of an enemy. Meanwhile, Micheletto arrives at della Rovere's home, where he gains his trust by showing the Cardinal his wounded back. In the Vatican, the Pope hears the confession of Giulia Farnese (Lotte Verbeek), a noble woman in Rome. She confesses that she ended her pregnancy, a sin which "only the Pope can forgive". The Pope allows her to reside in Cardinal Orsini's now empty palace while she performs her penance.

With the aid of Micheletto, Cardinal della Rovere assembles a large group of Cardinals and tells them of his plot to depose the Pope on accusation of corruption and simony. Unbeknownst to the Cardinals, Micheletto is eavesdropping on their conversation. Later, Micheletto brings Johannes Burchard (Simon McBurney) to della Rovere, who seeks his advice on deposing the Pope. The Deacon Cardinal tells della Rovere that the only way to depose a Pope is to prove public lechery. Meanwhile, the Pope makes use of a tunnel constructed by Cardinal Orsini, between his palace and the Vatican, has sex with Giulia Farnese, and commissions a painting of her. Lucrezia meets Giulia while she is being painted, and they quickly become friends. When Lucrezia tells her mother of her encounter with Giulia, and that the Pope had commissioned a painting of her, Vannozza meets with him the following day to accuse him of taking Farnese as his concubine.

Micheletto meets with Cesare to report on what he overheard in della Rovere's home. Cesare informs the Pope of della Rovere's plot to depose him, but Alexander is prepared to overcome it. Micheletto speaks with a young maid working in Orsini's palace, who claims she witnessed the Pope entering Giulia's bedchamber. The Pope visits with Burchard to discuss expanding the College of Cardinals by 13, and puts him to work on finding a precedent for an expansion of that size. In another meeting of della Rovere's Cardinals, he tells them that they must prove the Pope's notorious and public lechery, and brings in the young maid to tell them what she witnessed. Micheletto reports the maid's story to Cesare, who tells him to kill her. Micheletto finds the young woman and has sex with her in an aggressive and callous manner before dispatching her. During Consistory, the Pope tells the College of Cardinals of his intentions to expand the College, which includes making Cesare a Cardinal. This is met by accusations of lechery by Cardinal della Rovere, who storms out of Consistory. He retires to his home, where he finds the young maid murdered on his bed.

== Reception ==
=== Ratings ===
"The Assassin" (along with the previous episode, "The Poisoned Chalice", which aired prior to this episode) was viewed by 1.06 million people during its initial airing, which set a series high that has yet to be surpassed.
