= The Poisoned Chalice =

- The Borgias episode
- Episode no.: Season 1 Episode 1
- Directed by: Neil Jordan
- Written by: Neil Jordan
- Original air date: April 3, 2011

Guest appearances
- Peter Sullivan as Ascanio Sforza; Stephen Noonan as Deacon Cardinal; Michael Poole as Pope Innocent VIII; Vernon Dobtcheff as Cardinal Julius Versucci; Bosco Hogan as Cardinal Piccolomini; Laszlo Konter as Cardinal Colonna; David Lowe as the French Ambassador

Episode chronology
← Previous —	Next → "The Assassin"

"The Poisoned Chalice" is the pilot episode of the Showtime-Bravo! series The Borgias. It was written and directed by series creator Neil Jordan and originally aired on April 3, 2011, as the first half of a 2 hour premiere.

The episode deals with Rodrigo Borgia's election as Pope after the death of Pope Innocent VIII, and introduces the supporting cast of Borgia's family, and the College of Cardinals.

== Plot ==
Pope Innocent VIII (Michael Poole) calls the College of Cardinals into his bedchamber to hear his final words. Among them are Vice Chancellor Cardinal Rodrigo Borgia (Jeremy Irons), Cardinal Giuliano della Rovere (Colm Feore), and Cardinal Orsini (Derek Jacobi). Bishop Cesare Borgia (François Arnaud) arrives at the Vatican just before it closes for Papal conclave, where Rodrigo tells him of his intention to be elected Pope. He instructs Cesare to look for a dove in their home each night, carrying information for bribes to other Cardinals in exchange for their votes. Outside of the Vatican, Juan Borgia (David Oakes) battles with a Roman, and is saved by Cesare when he is blindsided by a second Roman. After the first unsuccessful vote, Rodrigo sends a dove to Cesare, instructing him to send titles and benefits from his various abbeys and monasteries to several Cardinals, hidden in their food. At the next vote, his total rises from 4 to 8, but is once again unsuccessful in gaining a majority.

Rodrigo sends another dove to Cesare, instructing him to send Juan to the Borgia churches and empty them of gold and precious stones to use as bribes. His vote total rises again to 10, but no Cardinal has a majority, so the vote is unsuccessful once again. Rodrigo meets with Cardinal Ascanio Sforza (Peter Sullivan) in private, and agrees that, should he be elected Pope, he will appoint Sforza as Vice Chancellor in exchange for Sforza's vote, and his supporters' votes. In the next vote, Rodrigo is elected Pope, with a majority 14 votes. Immediately following his election, he is accused of simony by Cardinals della Rovere and Orsini, but they are made silent after Rodrigo reminds them that he must select a Vice Chancellor, which includes a higher income. As both della Rovere and Orsini are considered front-runners for the position, they withdraw their accusations for the time.

After the College of Cardinals confirms that Rodrigo is male, Cesare confesses his sins to Rodrigo, including bribing several Cardinals in exchange for their support, of which he is absolved. Cesare pleads with his father to release him from his vows to the church and allow him to lead the papal armies, but he is denied in favour of Juan, who is made Gonfalonier of the Church. Later at his home, his mistress and the mother of his children Vannozza dei Cattanei (Joanne Whalley) is displeased when he denies her affections, as he must appear to be celibate. Following an elaborate parade, Rodrigo is crowned Pope, selecting the name Alexander VI.

Holding Consistory with the Cardinals, the Pope selects Cardinal Ascanio Sforza as his Vice Chancellor. Enraged, Cardinal Orsini once again accuses Borgia of simony, believing the position was promised to him. After Cardinal della Rovere openly approves of Cardinal Sforza's appointment and Borgia's papacy, he urges Orsini to do the same and save himself. He does, and invites the College of Cardinals and the Pope to a banquet at his palace.

Alexander brings Cesare with him to the banquet as his guest, but is confused as to why Cesare brings a monkey with him. During dinner, Cesare excuses himself to clean up after the monkey, and observes a servant quickly fleeing the dining room. Cesare follows him to the kitchens, where he observes the servant mixing something. After a short fight, Cesare hires the servant, who reveals himself as an assassin named Michelotto (Sean Harris), to serve Cardinal Orsini poisoned wine. When Cesare returns to dinner, Orsini proposes a toast, and after sitting down, begins to die. He attempts to accuse the Pope as his murderer, but dies before he can finish his accusation. The room erupts in chaos, and Cesare quickly escorts his father out of Orsini's palace and to safety.

== Reception ==
=== Ratings ===
"The Poisoned Chalice" (along with the next episode, "The Assassin", which aired immediately following) was viewed by 1.06 million people during its initial airing, which set a series high that has yet to be surpassed.
