= Good Cop Bad Dog =

- Modern Family episode
- Claire (Julie Bowen) with Manny (Rico Rodriguez) and Luke (Nolan Gould) at go-karting
- Episode no.: Season 2 Episode 22
- Directed by: Fred Savage
- Story by: Abraham Higginbotham
- Teleplay by: Abraham Higginbotham; Jeffrey Richman
- Production code: 2ARG22
- Original air date: May 11, 2011

Guest appearance
- Lin-Manuel Miranda as Guillermo

Episode chronology
← Previous "Mother's Day"	Next → "See You Next Fall"
- Modern Family season 2

"Good Cop Bad Dog" is the 22nd episode of the American comedy television series Modern Family's second season and the 46th episode overall. The episode originally aired on May 11, 2011, on American Broadcasting Company (ABC). The episode was written by Abraham Higginbotham & Jeffrey Richman and was guest directed by former child star Fred Savage. It guest starred Lin-Manuel Miranda as Guillermo, the Grocery Store worker who tries to convince Jay to invest with him.

In the episode, Jay advises a dog trainer, while Phil and Claire switch parenting duties to the kids' chagrin. Mitchell has an extra Lady Gaga ticket when Cameron ends up sick. The episode introduces the Pritchetts' new dog that will appear for the rest of the season and for a majority of the third.

"Good Cop Bad Dog" received positive reviews from critics with many praising Ty Burrell's performance. The episode was viewed by more than 10 million viewers and received a 4.2 rating/11% share in the 18–49 demographic, marking an 8 percent rise in the ratings from the previous episode, "Mother's Day". The episode was also the highest-rated scripted program of the original week it aired among adults between the ages of 18 and 49. Burrell eventually received an Emmy for his performance in the episode.

== Plot ==
In the Dunphy household, Alex (Ariel Winter) and Haley (Sarah Hyland) are furious at Manny (Rico Rodriguez) and Luke (Nolan Gould) for barging into their room while they were changing. This leads to their mother, Claire (Julie Bowen) to yell at them, while their dad, Phil (Ty Burrell) attempts to push himself away from Claire's anger behind her back. Annoyed, Claire confronts Phil about how he always makes her play the 'bad cop' role in their family and keeps the 'good cop' role for himself. He reluctantly agrees to switch roles with her. Claire takes Manny and Luke go-karting (although Phil had been quite keen to go), while Phil has to stay and make the girls clean their bathroom. The go-karting goes horribly as Claire, whilst trying to be fun, crashes her kart into the boys, and pushes them into ordering large quantities of food. While driving home, Luke gets sick from drinking a milkshake he hadn't even wanted. At home, Phil goes berserk when the girls lie to him about cleaning the bathroom and jumps on their car to stop them from leaving. He then forces them to clean both their bathroom and his, under his direct supervision, whilst duct-taping their laptops shut. That evening, Phil and Claire admit that they cannot handle each other's natural parent roles, and agree to go back to normal.

Meanwhile, Gloria (Sofía Vergara) wants to help a grocery-store worker, Guillermo (Lin-Manuel Miranda), so she convinces Jay (Ed O'Neill) to let Guillermo pitch him a business idea: a dog-training system labeled "The Good-doggy / Bad-doggy Training System", which consists of two sets of dog treats, one of them being bland and the other a tastier one with bacon. The pitch goes wrong when Guillermo's dog, Stella (Brigitte), chews on Jay's pillow and seems to prefer the bad doggy treat. Seeing that Gloria's blind encouragement is doing him no favours, Jay adopts a firm, frank tone with Guillermo and tells him that, while he has obvious presentation skills, enthusiasm and charisma, his idea has no legs. Guillermo, who had invested five years of his life in this idea, leaves in tears. Gloria follows him to apologize, but Guillermo admits that he found Jay's honesty refreshing, and has decided to reorganize his life, which means moving back in with his sister to go back to school, but it also means that he must give the dog away. Gloria allows the dog to stay with them much to Jay's anger, which is increased when Manny walks in and believes the dog is a present for him. Jay drives the dog to the pound, but Stella's sweet face makes him take her back home.

Mitchell (Jesse Tyler Ferguson) has bought tickets to a Lady Gaga concert, but his plans go south when Cameron (Eric Stonestreet) gets sick. This causes Mitchell to be torn on whether he should stay with Cameron or go to the concert. He eventually tries to be supporting and attempts to subtly persuade Cameron to let him go, as Claire has advised him to do. Mitchell tries to sneak away after noticing that Cameron has drunk most of a cough syrup that would "put down a Grizzly", but he is caught when Cam wakes up. Mitchell then gives a speech about how selfish he has been to Cameron, before realizing Cameron has fallen asleep once more. He then sneaks off to the concert and comes back before Cameron wakes up again. When Cameron does wake up, Mitchell acts as if he never went out, unaware that his glow stick is still visible underneath his shirt. As Cameron returns to bed, he pleasantly informs Mitchell that his glow-stick is still flashing, and switches off the light to reveal it.

== Production ==
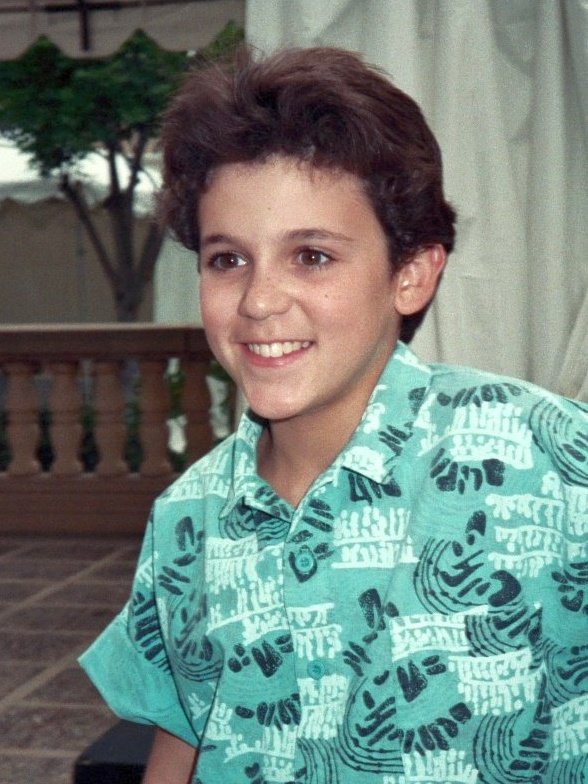
Fred Savage (pictured from 1989) guest directed the episode.

"Good Cop Bad Dog" was written by Abraham Higginbotham and Jeffrey Richman, the former receiving third writing credit for the series having previously written "The Kiss" and "Regrets Only" and the latter receiving his fourth writing credit for the series. Higginbotham received a story credit for the episode, as well. The episode was directed by guest director Fred Savage, best known for his performance in The Wonder Years.

The episode was filmed on March 3, and March 4, 2011. The episode features a guest appearance by Puerto Rican-American composer and singer Lin-Manuel Miranda. The episode marks the introduction of the Pritchetts’ new dog, a French Bulldog played by Brigette. According to Rico Rodriguez, who plays Manny on the show, "She'll probably be in the last three episodes of the season and then in multiple episodes next year [...] [She] has fit in very well".

== Reception ==
=== Ratings ===
In its original American broadcast on May 11, 2011, "Good Cop Bad Dog" was viewed by an estimated 10.113 million households and received a 4.2 rating/11% share among adults between the ages of 18 and 49. This means that it was seen by 4.2% of all 18- to 49-year-olds, and 11% of all 18- to 49-year-olds watching television at the time of the broadcast. This marked an 8 percent rise in the ratings from the previous episode, "Mother's Day". In its timeslot, "Good Cop Bad Dog" was outperformed by Fox reality television series, American Idol which received a 6.9 rating/20 share in the 18–49 demographic. However, the series defeated CBS crime drama Criminal Minds which received a 3.1 rating/8% share, a rerun of NBC reality series, Minute to Win It which received a 0.9 rating/2% share and The CW reality series, America's Next Top Model with received a 0.8 rating/2% share. "Good Cop Bad Dog" was the most-watched scripted show for the week of broadcast among adults aged 18–49, and the twenty-third most-watched show among all viewers. Added with the DVR viewers, the episode received a 6.5 rating in the 18–49 demographic, adding a 2.2 rating to the original viewership.

=== Reviews ===
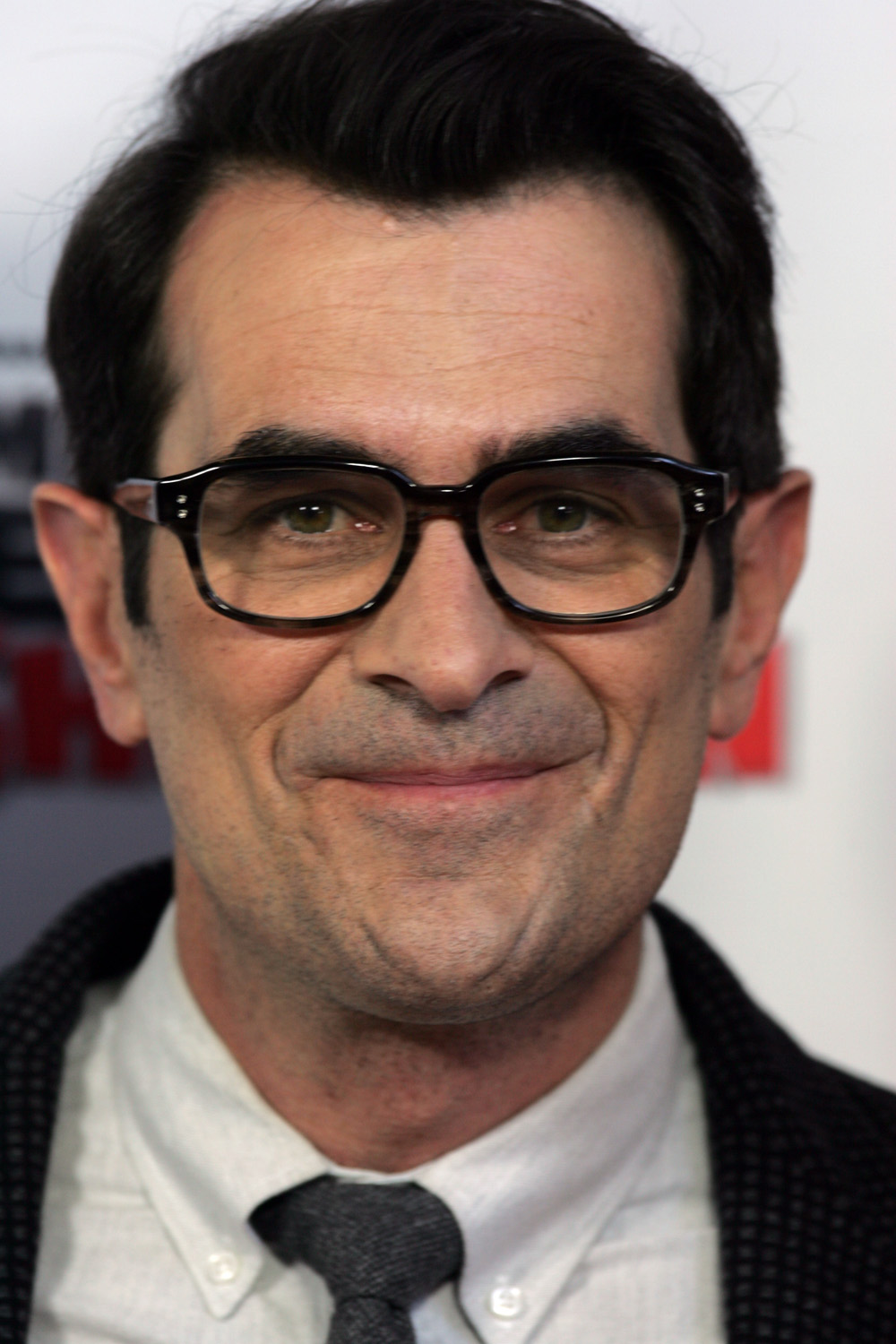
Ty Burrell's performance received praise from multiple critics. He won an Emmy for his performance in this episode.

The episode received mostly positive reviews from critics with many commenting on Ty Burrell's performance.

Entertainment Weekly writer Leseley Savage praised the episode's theme commenting that "while tonight's theme of switching roles definitely wasn't subtle, it was still clever." She named Burrell the "MVP" saying that "When he jumped onto the roof of their car, I nearly died".

The A.V. Club's Donna Bowman wrote that the episode showed "flashes of brilliance in this half hour that were equally due to the situations set up by the writers and to the talents of the cast". Despite the mainly positive review, she criticized the Mitchell and Cameron plot for not having "much warmth". She ultimately gave the episode a B+ while readers of the article gave it a B.

New York writer Rachael Maddux praised the episode for " revealing new sides of several personalities" commenting that "our favorite moments over the last twenty-something Modern Family episodes have almost entirely involved learning something new about these characters".

CNN reviewer Henry Hanks wrote, "Wednesday night's Modern Family was an example of the series at the top of its game." He also called Burrell the "this week's MVP".

TV Squad writer Joel Keller praised Phil and Claire's plot for recycling a standard television trope while still having "the biggest laughs". Keller criticized the Mitchell and Cam subplot "because Cam's personality was tamped down by sickness" and later wrote, "Yes, I just said you can rehash stuff if done well. This one wasn't done well."

Not all reviews were positive. Christine Ziemba of Paste called the episode "uneven", but wrote that "it still had its moments". She praised Ty Burrell's performance calling him "the episode’s scene stealer". She ultimately gave the episode a 6.9/10 calling it "respectable".

Sam Morgan of Hollywood.com complimented the writers for attempting to write a "classic MF episode" but concluded, "It had some very funny bits, but that heart it searched far and wide for just wasn’t there".
