= Someone to Watch Over Lily =

- Modern Family episode
- Cam (Eric Stonestreet) and Mitch (Jesse Tyler Ferguson) discussing about who will be Lily's guardians
- Episode no.: Season 2 Episode 20
- Directed by: Michael Spiller
- Written by: Bill Wrubel
- Production code: 2ARG18
- Original air date: April 20, 2011

Guest appearances
- Alice Dodd as Dr. Klausner; Rachel Marie as Gabby

Episode chronology
← Previous "The Musical Man"	Next → "Mother's Day"
- Modern Family season 2

"Someone to Watch Over Lily" is the 20th episode of the American comedy television series Modern Family's second season, and the 44th episode overall. It was originally aired on April 20, 2011. The episode was written by Bill Wrubel and directed by Michael Spiller.

In the episode, Mitchell and Cameron are looking to assign legal guardians for Lily in case anything were to happen to them, and are secretly assessing their family members. But no one is impressive, as they witness Jay giving Manny a dose of tough love, Claire secretly taking Luke to a child psychologist to assess his development, and Haley and Alex getting into some delinquent activities at school.

"Someone to Watch Over Lily" received generally positive reviews from critics. The episode was viewed by 9.83 million households and received a 3.8 rating/10% share among adults between the ages of 18 and 49, making it the lowest rated episode of the season tying with "Mother Tucker".

== Plot ==
Mitchell (Jesse Tyler Ferguson) and Cameron (Eric Stonestreet) are looking for a legal guardian for Lily in case the two were to die, and are secretly assessing their family members. After turning down the option of Claire (Julie Bowen) and Phil (Ty Burrell) to be the ones when they drop by their house in full mayhem, Mitchell is trying to convince Cameron that Jay (Ed O'Neill) and Gloria (Sofía Vergara) can be the best guardians while Cameron says that his family could be Lily's guardians, something that Mitchell rejects saying that Cam's family is in Missouri, far away from everything Lily knows.

Jay takes Manny (Rico Rodriguez) to a store and Mitch and Cam go with them. While they are discussing about who can be Lily's guardian, they witness Jay making Manny ascend a rock climbing wall in a sports store. In the meantime Gloria took Lily with her for a walk and she pierced her ears. When everyone comes back home and sees that, the discussion of Jay and Gloria being the best guardians comes up again.

Meanwhile, Claire is secretly taking Luke (Nolan Gould) to a child psychologist to assess his development because she is worried about him. Phil finds out about it and he is already there, surprising Claire. After the session is over, Claire and Phil are fighting about something Claire said to the psychologist; that she is afraid that Luke is turning into Phil. While they are fighting, they get into their cars to get back home, accidentally leaving Luke behind. Back home, while they are talking, they realize that they left Luke behind and they panic. On their way to go and find him, someone brings Luke back home by limousine. Listening to his story and how he managed to find someone to bring him back home, Claire says that he is an incredible kid and she should not be worried.

Claire asks Haley (Sarah Hyland) to take her sister Alex (Ariel Winter) to her cello lesson while she was picking up her friend Gabby (Rachael Marie). While she was dropping Alex off, Gabby told her something a classmate said about her. Alex comes back in saying her cello instructor wasn't home so Haley and Gabby take her with them to break into their school and spray shaving foam into the classmate's locker, for which a security guard arrests them. Haley and Alex manage to escape to the car where Alex reveals that she hadn't gone to her instructor's house and didn't really like playing the cello, Haley convinces her to stop, and sprays the shaving foam in her face.

Mitch and Cam want to make the announcement about who will be Lily's guardians. Mitch is ready to say that they will be Claire and Phil but Cameron, after a discussion he had with Manny about Jay, interrupts him and says that Jay and Gloria will be the ones. That makes Gloria really happy. Claire is not that happy with that decision and she is trying to ask why they did not choose her and Phil since they are raising three kids amazingly. While saying that, Phil tells her that they have to go because their daughters had vandalized the school.

== Production ==
"Someone to Watch Over Lily" was written by co-executive producer Bill Wrubel, his sixth writing credit for the series. The episode was also directed by Michael Spiller, his thirteenth directing credit for the series. The episode was filmed between January 17, and January 21, 2011.

== Reception ==
=== Ratings ===
In its original American broadcast, "Someone to Watch Over Lily" was viewed by an estimated 9.83 million households and received a 3.8 rating/10% share among adults between the ages of 18 and 49. This means that it was seen by 3.7% of all 18- to 49-year-olds, and 10% of all 18- to 49-year-olds watching television at the time of the broadcast. This made it the lowest-rated episode of the second season, tying with "Mother Tucker". This also marked a slight drop in the ratings from the previous episode, "The Musical Man". Despite this, the episode became tied for being the highest rated scripted program among 18-49 viewers. The episode tied with Glee's "A Night of Neglect".

=== Reviews ===
The episode received mostly positive reviews from critics.

The A.V. Club's Donna Bowman wrote positively of the episode, praising the use of "conventional plots" and adding "professionalism, a keen eye, good timing, and an approach that rediscovers the delight in this standard situation." She also called it an improvement over "The Musical Man" and ultimately gave this episode an A−. TV Squad writer Joel Keller called the episode "mediocre", writing that it didn't reach its potential of being "one of the top episodes of the year". Despite this, he said the episode was "still pretty damned good". Alan Sepinwall of HitFix, who has had serious issues with the show's second season and moved the series out of his "commenting on every episode" rotation, gave the episode a positive review. He called it "ambitious episode, but never one that felt overstuffed." He ultimately called it the best episode since "Manny Get Your Gun".

New York writer Rachael Maddux praised the episode's writing and pacing, saying it is "in the running for best of the season". She also praised the character development writing that it featured the most character development "than perhaps any other single episode in the whole series so far."

Lesley Savage of Entertainment Weekly praised the Dunphy family plot, commenting, "Their craziness [...] had me dying throughout the entire episode."
