= See You Next Fall =

- Modern Family episode
- Alex (Ariel Winter) while giving her graduation speech
- Episode no.: Season 2 Episode 23
- Directed by: Steven Levitan
- Written by: Danny Zuker
- Production code: 2ARG24
- Original air date: May 18, 2011

Guest appearance
- Gina St. John as Principal Kaizler

Episode chronology
← Previous "Good Cop Bad Dog"	Next → "The One That Got Away"
- Modern Family season 2

"See You Next Fall" is the 23rd episode of the American comedy television series, Modern Family's second season and the 47th episode overall. The episode originally aired on May 18, 2011, on American Broadcasting Company (ABC). The episode was written by Danny Zuker and directed by Modern Family co-creator and executive producer, Steven Levitan.

The episode revolves around the family getting prepared for Alex's graduation, while Jay tries to hide a Botox mishap. Cameron feels hurt by Mitchell laughing at his expense, Phil comforts Claire so he can go with his friends to Las Vegas, and Haley gives Alex advice on her Valedictorian speech.

"See You Next Fall" received positive reviews from critics, some of whom said that it felt like a season finale, even though it was the season's penultimate episode. Among the elements singled out for praise were the slapstick, and the performances by Ty Burrell, Julie Bowen, Sarah Hyland, and Ariel Winter. According to Nielsen Media Research, the episode was watched by 10 million viewers and received a 4.0 rating/10% share in the 18–49 demographic, marking a 7 percent drop in the ratings from the previous episode, "Good Cop Bad Dog".

== Plot ==
The episode begins at Franklin School, where Alex (Ariel Winter) is giving a speech as the Valedictorian (as it turns out, Alex became the class valedictorian after Sanjay Patel, the only one who was doing better than she in school, was attacked by a robot of his own creation and had to miss classes). The entire Pritchett Family is there, except for Phil (Ty Burrell) and Claire (Julie Bowen).

The episode shifts back four hours earlier to the Dunphy household, where all are preparing for Alex's graduation, and Phil and Claire are extremely happy, much to Alex's irritation, particularly when her efforts to rehearse her speech are continually interrupted by Claire who wants just to hug and kiss her little girl. Phil, meanwhile, has planned a trip to Las Vegas with his cheer squad friends for the next day and, needing Claire to have her meltdown that day, rather than the next, repeatedly prods Claire on account of Alex's changing behaviour.

Before they leave, Haley (Sarah Hyland) enters Alex's room and discovers that her speech consists of a harsh angry rant that is heavily laced with hatred. It criticizes her entire grade for being unintelligent and shallow, and it also attacks them for continually treating her as if she did not exist. Mortified, she tries to convince Alex not to give that speech, and to improvise by rehashing old motivational songs, such as Don't Stop Believin' and Get the Party Started. She refuses, justifying herself by saying that her idol, Gandhi, went on hunger-strike for what he believed, to which Haley replies that he did it only "because no one would eat with him in the cafeteria," inadvertently proving Alex's point. She then turns down her mother's suggestion that they ride together in a Carpool, deciding to go early with Haley.

At Tucker-Pritchett house, while playing with Lily in a mini-pool, Mitchell (Jesse Tyler Ferguson) and Cameron (Eric Stonestreet) are talking about Alex's graduation, and Mitchell notes that he was in the room when Alex was born. Cameron scoffs at him, commenting on the birthing he had to witness on his family farm, when he accidentally steps on a rubber soccer ball and falls into the pool, causing Mitchell to laugh hysterically, to his irritation.

Jay (Ed O'Neill) arrives home and Gloria (Sofía Vergara) notices that his eye is droopy. He initially brushes it aside, claiming that he went to the dermatologist and it is probably the effect of a numbing cream that he had, but he later admits that he had botox and it was drifting.

The whole family gathers at Jay's house before heading out to Alex's graduation. As Mitchell and Cameron arrive, Claire orders Luke (Nolan Gould) to stop playing with a basketball that is floating in the pool, in case he falls in, to which Cameron makes reference to the incident with the mini-pool. Mitchell defends his position, but the rest of the family is concerned that he might have been injured. As they all prepare to leave, Cameron walks into a glass door, which prompts all the Pritchetts to laugh, to the shock of Phil and Gloria, and making Cameron believe that Mitchell’s mean sense of humor is “a Pritchett thing”. When Jay accidentally takes off his glasses, the entire family is horrified at the state of his face, which has gotten worse and all indicate that he should go to the hospital, but all are taken aback when Mitchell guesses that it is a botox job gone wrong.

When all seems calm, the front gate will not open and Claire finally melts down, to Phil's relief. With the entire family stuck inside the house, Gloria proposes that Claire and Phil jump over the fence, while they throw a Tandem bicycle, and they can use that. At first, the idea works, but halfway to the school, the chain breaks, which worsens Claire's meltdown, since she believes that they are losing Alex just as much as they have lost Haley, and prompting Phil to suffer a meltdown of his own. They are rescued when a truck pulls over, and Phil asks the Hispanic occupants for a lift in halting Spanish, only to discover that they speak perfect English.

Meanwhile, Haley attempts to stop Alex's speech by stealing her notes, but fails, because Alex has brought duplicates. After reading the rest of the speech, Haley asks if she hates her, because of what it says about popular kids being shallow and lame. When Alex responds by asking Haley what kind of problems she has and sarcastically suggests they would be having too many boys chasing her and too many parties to go to, Haley loses her temper and informs her that her problems include flunking biology, having to go to Summer School and potentially not being able to get into college at all, while possibly being left behind by her friends. She dismissively tells Alex that she is a bright, good-looking and charismatic girl, but by making the speech, she will only be making an outcast of herself, and that she can either start afresh at high school, or be known as the girl who gave her class the middle finger. This hits Alex hard and finally makes her doubt herself and her speech.

At Jay's the gate finally opens on its own, with Luke believing that he opened it with his mind, and they all rush to school. As Alex is about to begin her speech, the entire family wonders where Phil and Claire are. They arrive just in time, though not before falling down a hill, before standing up with as much dignity that they have left and taking their places, which causes Cameron to laugh, with Mitchell growing angry at his hypocrisy.

Having finally had second-thoughts, Alex does not recite her original speech, instead giving a sincere, but halting speech that simultaneously quotes motivational songs and praises her grade. Afterward, Alex is invited to a graduation party and goes there, much to Phil and Claire's growing dismay, but Haley responds that she could have lunch with her parents, to which they hug her effusively, embarrassing her.

== Production ==
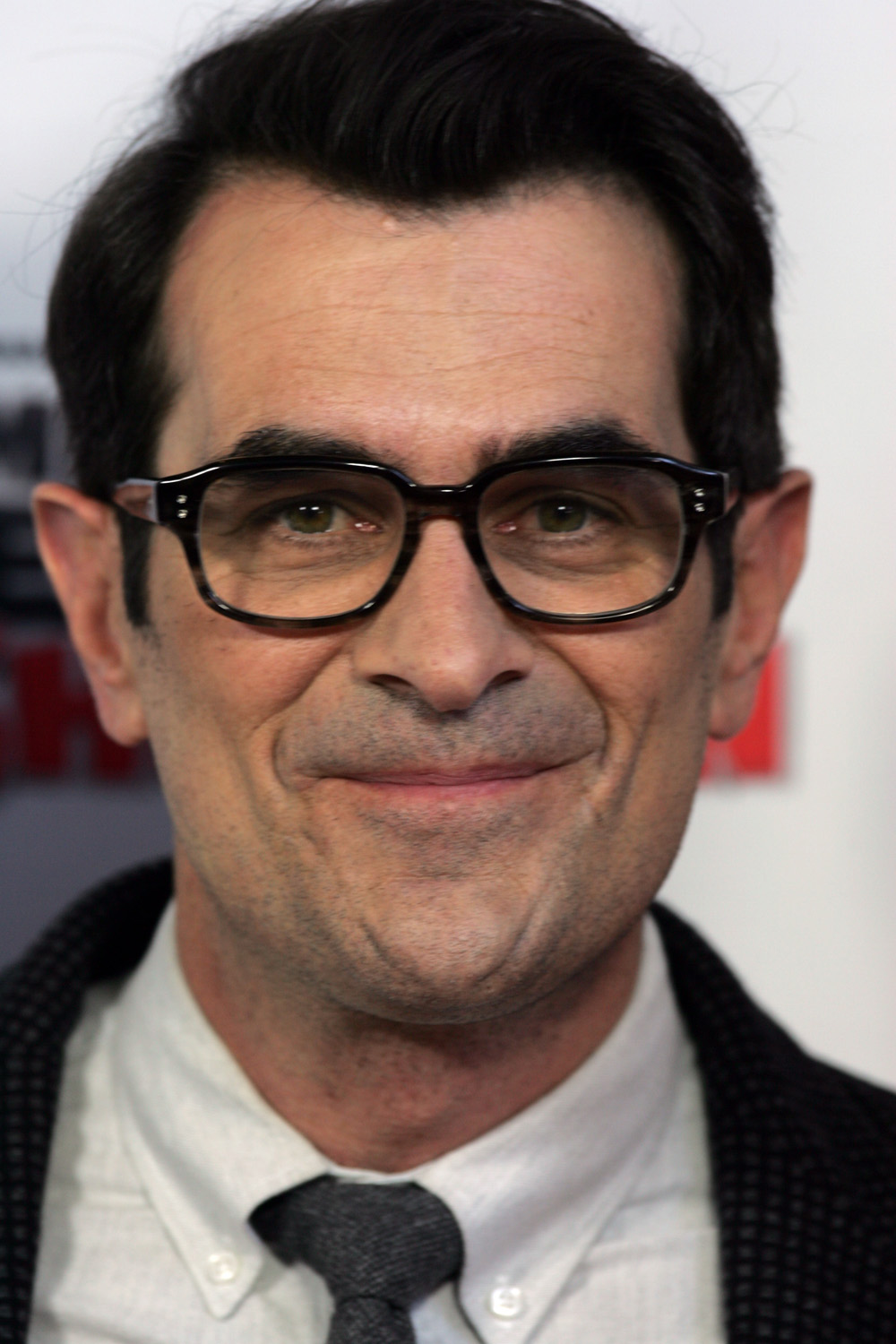
Ty Burrell had a difficult time convincing the producers to let him do his own stunts.

"See You Next Fall" was written by Danny Zuker, his seventh writing credit for the series. The episode was also directed by Modern Family co-creator and executive producer, Steven Levitan, his second directing credit for the series, having previously directed the first season's penultimate episode, "Hawaii". The episode features a guest appearance from Gina St. John as the principal of Alex's school. The episode was filmed between March 14 and March 18. It was originally set to be the season finale and was the last episode of the season filmed. Ty Burrell said in an interview with TV Guide, called the episode "it was actually one of the most fun episodes I've ever filmed". He also said it was difficult for him and Bowen to convince the producers to let them fall down the hill without using stunt actors. Burrell later named it his favorite scene to shoot of the season.

== Reception ==
=== Ratings ===
In its original American broadcast, "See You Next Fall" was viewed by an estimated 10.08 million households and received a 4.1 rating/11% share among adults between the ages of 18 and 49. This means that it was seen by 4.1% of all 18- to 49-year-olds, and 11% of all 18- to 49-year-olds watching television at the time of the broadcast. This marked a slight drop in the ratings from the previous episode, "Good Cop Bad Dog". In its timeslot, "See You Next Fall" was defeated by Fox reality series, American Idol which received a 7.2 rating/20% share in the 18–49 demographic. However, the series defeated CBS crime drama Criminal Minds which received a 3.3 rating/8% share, a rerun episode of the NBC reality series Minute to Win It which received a 0.9 rating/2% share and the season finale of CW reality series America's Next Top Model which also received a 0.9 rating/2% share. "See You Next Fall" was the most-watched scripted show for the week of broadcast among adults aged 18–49, and was the eighteenth most-watched show among all viewers. Added with DVR viewers, "See You Next Fall" received a 6.2 rating marking a 51 percent rise from the original viewership.

=== Reviews ===
"See You Next Fall" was met with critical acclaim from multiple television critics with the scene featuring Phil and Claire falling down receiving positive reviews.

HitFix reviewer Alan Sepinwall said that the episode "the show has been on a real roll these last few weeks, and [...] 'See You Next Fall' continued that strong trend." He praised the Dunphy plot, saying that it showed "silliness plus heart at its best" and complimented the episode's tag scene, calling it an "hilarious moment" and that "Sarah Hyland's reaction to the hug was terrific". TV Squad writer Joel Keller wrote that the episode would have worked as a perfect season finale. Keller also praised Hyland's performance calling it "[her] best acting job".

Christine Ziemba of Paste complemented the episode for being "a little more tender then hilarious" calling it a "welcome relief". She also praised Ty Burrell and Julie Bowen's performance, saying they "[stole] the spotlight", in particular the scene featuring "the two rolling down a hill of the school just as Alex's speech begins". She ultimately gave the episode 7.3 calling it "respectable".

Entertainment Weekly writer Lesley Savage said the episode "established why this cast is one of the best comedy ensembles on television", praising their ability to "deliver an acerbic quip that leaves us in stitches or a tender moment".

Meredith Blake of The Los Angeles Times positively compared the episode to "Manny Get Your Gun" and praised the writers for featuring multiple story lines and making it "work perfectly". She also praised the episode for letting "everyone in this fantastic ensemble has something to do this week" calling it a "major factor in the success of the episode".

James Poniewozik of Time praised the episode for its "high-quality interaction among the three family groups" commenting that it helped make the episode seem like the season finale.
