= Two Monkeys and a Panda =

- Modern Family episode
- Phil (Ty Burrell) at the spa
- Episode no.: Season 2 Episode 17
- Directed by: Beth McCarthy-Miller
- Written by: Carol Leifer
- Production code: 2ARG15
- Original air date: March 2, 2011

Guest appearances
- Jonathan McMurtry as Ed; Mary Anne McGarry as Winnie; Tangie Ambrose as Noranne; Christen Sussin as Laurie

Episode chronology
← Previous "Regrets Only"	Next → "Boys' Night"
- Modern Family season 2

"Two Monkeys and a Panda" is the 17th episode of the second season of the American comedy television series Modern Family and the 41st episode overall. It was originally aired on March 2, 2011. The episode was written by Carol Leifer and directed by Beth McCarthy-Miller.

In the episode, Claire tries everything to prevent Haley and Alex from fighting about a sweater that belonged to Haley and Alex accidentally tore while Phil enjoys a day at the spa using a gift certificate. Cameron decides to write a book that celebrates the fact that Lily is adopted but he soon finds out that Lily has only Mitchell's last name and not his. Mitchell promises to fix it and tries to explain why this happened in order to calm Cameron down. Jay wants to buy two side-by-side crypts for him and Gloria as preparation of their death. Gloria is horrified with the idea and tries to change his mind especially when their "future neighbors", an elderly couple, wants to discuss with them the fact that they will be neighbors for eternity.

"Two Monkeys and a Panda" received positive reviews from critics, with many praising its more emotional tone compared to the rest of the season.

== Plot ==
Claire (Julie Bowen) runs herself ragged trying to fix the relationship between Haley (Sarah Hyland) and Alex (Ariel Winter), after Haley tries to keep Alex from wearing one of her sweaters, and therefore has no time for or interest in Phil's (Ty Burrell) plan to use a gift certificate for a spa before its next-day expiration. Alex accidentally tears the sweater on a loose door-frame nail, so Claire is left to drive to numerous clothing stores and find a replacement.

In the meantime, Phil enjoys facial and pedicure treatments while having a nice chat with the local housewives. However, his ideas for helping Claire annoy both her and his fellow spa-goers, and they tell him that Claire does not need even careful, reasonable advice of the brand Phil produces when she is in crisis mode; she needs him to be empathetic towards her. When the matching sweater Claire tracked down turns out to have a stray anti-shoplifting dye pack, Haley and Alex renew their row and Claire is devastated. Phil is non-specifically kind to her and Claire looks very relieved and happy with her husband's support.

Meanwhile, Gloria (Sofía Vergara) is horrified by Jay's (Ed O'Neill) morbid plans to purchase two side-by-side crypts in preparation of their death. Amongst other things, it is a reminder that Jay is much older than she, and when they visit the mausoleum neither of them are happy when a creepy older couple who also have co-crypts want to chat up their "future neighbors". When Jay has a talk with Manny (Rico Rodriguez) about how much their lives changed upon meeting him, he changes his mind on the crypts and has a new plan: he will be cremated and have his ashes put in a can that will sit on the house mantle forever, thus thwarting some "future putz" who would be interested in newly widowed Gloria.

Cameron (Eric Stonestreet) decides he wants to write a book that celebrates the fact that Lily is adopted, but soon learns something new about Lily's last name. Specifically, she has Mitchell's (Jesse Tyler Ferguson) last name as her last name and Cameron's last name as her middle name. Cam is angry about this until Mitchell admits he was worried about them staying together, and apologizes with promises to give their daughter a hyphenated name of co-equals. Mitchell does admit that their house is in his name alone, as well.

== Production ==
"Two Monkeys and a Panda" was written by a freelance writer, Carol Leifer who had previously written for Seinfeld. The episode was also directed by Beth McCarthy-Miller, her first credit for the series as well. The episode was filmed on December 13, and December 14, 2010. Miller was originally slated to direct an episode that would be filmed in October, but had to choose a later episode in order to direct the 30 Rock episode, "Live Show".

== Reception ==
=== Ratings ===
In its original American broadcast, "Two Monkeys and a Panda" was viewed by an estimated 10.110 million households and received a 4.1 rating/11% share among adults between the ages of 18 and 49. This means that it was seen by 4.1% of all 18- to 49-year-olds, and 11% of all 18- to 49-year-olds watching television at the time of the broadcast. This made it the season's lowest-rated episode, tying with "Regrets Only". "Two Monkeys and a Panda" was the third most-watched scripted show for the week of broadcast among adults aged 18–49, and the twenty-third most-watched show among all viewers.

=== Reviews ===
"Two Monkeys and a Panda" received positive reviews from critics with many comparing it, positively, to the first season.

TV Squad writer Joel Keller praised the episode's emotional side comparing it to the first season of the series writing that the second season "had been lacking a little bit" of this. Keller also praised the performance of Jesse Tyler Ferguson and Eric Stonestreet calling their storyline "real, dramatic, and a little raw, especially for this show.".

Rachael Maddux of New York said that despite the episode's lack of humor, "we got back in some much-needed fleshing out of important relationships.".

Emily VanDerWerff from The A.V. Club gave an A− rate to the episode and named it "the best episode the show has produced in 2011, so far".

Matt Richenthal from TV Fanatic rated the episode with 4.6/5 saying that "Two Monkeys and a Panda" might have been his favorite episode of the season. "Thanks to a focus on serious issues, Modern Family rebounded from a couple subpar episodes with what may have been my favorite of the season."
