= Manny Get Your Gun =

- Modern Family episode
- Manny (Rico Rodriguez) giving a speech at his birthday dinner
- Episode no.: Season 2 Episode 8
- Directed by: Michael Spiller
- Story by: Christopher Lloyd
- Teleplay by: Danny Zuker
- Production code: 2ARG11
- Original air date: November 17, 2010

Guest appearances
- Norman Lloyd as Donald; Norma Michaels as Helen

Episode chronology
← Previous "Chirp"	Next → "Mother Tucker"
- Modern Family season 2

"Manny Get Your Gun" is the eighth episode of the second season of the sitcom, Modern Family and the 32nd overall. It originally aired November 17, 2010 on the American Broadcasting Company (ABC). The episode was written by Danny Zuker, from a story by Modern Family co-creator, Christopher Lloyd and was directed by Michael Spiller.

In the episode, everyone gathers at a restaurant for Manny's birthday when Manny has a mini-life crisis of getting older; Phil and Claire have a race to see who can get there faster; and Mitchell and Cam get stuck at the mall looking for a gift.

"Manny Get Your Gun" received overwhelmingly positive reviews from critics with Joel Keller of TV Squad naming it "one of the better ones of the season. According to the Nielsen Media Research, the episode received the same ratings as the previous episode, "Chirp" and became the second highest rated scripted series of the original week it aired.

== Plot ==
The episode begins with Manny (Rico Rodriguez) starting his birthday speech to a table filled with angry family members.

The episode then goes 30 minutes earlier showing Claire (Julie Bowen) hurrying everyone to get to the party on time. This prompts a contest between Claire and Phil (Ty Burrell) to see whose route is quicker. Phil rides with Alex (Ariel Winter) and Haley (Sarah Hyland), and Luke (Nolan Gould) with Claire.

In Claire's car, Luke asks Claire why she is separating from Phil misunderstanding Claire's earlier statement of the two parents were "separating". Claire reassures Luke that they are fine and just going separate routes. Claire then starts asking Luke why he wanted to go with Phil instead of her. She stops the car to have a talk with Luke which makes her sadder, but Luke makes her happy by telling her that she is fun too but he wanted to be with Phil because he thought Phil needed him more than Claire does and that her route is faster than Phil's.

In Phil's car, while he tries convincing the girls the race is not a waste of time, the car's wheels go out. After fixing it, Haley and Alex tell him that they do not want to go to family camp. This causes Phil to cry which in turn causes Haley and Alex to cry. This saps Phil's motivation to beat Claire, but Haley and Alex eventually restore his motivation to win.

Meanwhile, Mitchell (Jesse Tyler Ferguson) and Cameron (Eric Stonestreet) are walking through the mall looking for a present for Manny. While there, Cameron stops to help an elderly man named Donald (Norman Lloyd) to convince an old lady named Helen (Norma Michaels) to take him back, despite Mitchell's protests that they are running out of time. Cameron is initially delighted to help before realizing Donald is an adulterer. Cameron and Mitchell soon continue their fight about Mitchell not being spontaneous but in the middle of the discussion, Mitchell takes part in a flash mob with a bunch of people to "Free Your Mind". Mitchell initially thinks Cameron will be happy, but Cameron becomes angry that Mitchell kept it a secret from him. They soon have another fight in their car.

In the Pritchett house, Gloria (Sofía Vergara) and Jay (Ed O'Neill) have a fight over Gloria's habit of losing everything and currently losing her keys. Jay initially believes he is right before finding the keys in his pockets, but instead of apologizing to Gloria he secretes the keys in her purse.

In the meantime, Manny becomes depressed after Jay informs him he never truly acted like a kid. He tries to live his life as a kid before the party with bad prank calls and mixing sodas. He then opens his old Christmas present (a flotation device) and putting it in a pool. A furious Gloria angry at Manny not wanting to go his own party shoots the flotation device with a BB gun Jay gave him. In the car, Jay finally tells Gloria the truth making her furious.

After all the family members see that they are about to arrive late, they race to the restaurant, coming close to crashing into each other. The scene then goes to Manny finishing his speech saying that he has enough time to act like a kid, as his older family members still do, leading to everyone reconciling with one another.

== Production ==
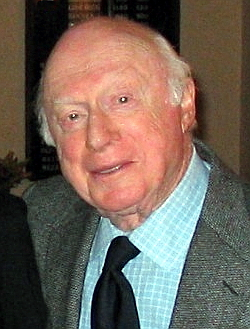
Norman Lloyd guest starred as an elderly mall goer.

"Manny Get Your Gun" was written by Danny Zuker, but was based on a story by Modern Family's co-creator, Christopher Lloyd. The episode marked Zucker's fifth writing credit for the series and Lloyd's first story credit. The episode was directed by Michael Spiller, his eighth director's episode. "Manny Get Your Gun" originally aired on November 17, 2010. The episode was filmed on October 20, October 21, and October 27, 2010.

The episode was originally titled "Dash, Flash, Crash" in the original press release, the episode's title was later formally changed to "Manny Get Your Gun". Part of the episode's plot is based on a personal experience of Steven Levitan. He stated in an interview "My wife and I have a constant argument about when we're in a restaurant, which way to take home - which is the faster way home."

On October 15, 2010, William Keck of TV Guide reported that Norman Lloyd of St. Elsewhere was to guest star as a senior citizen who Cameron befriends. He filmed his appearance on October 21, 2010.

The episode was later put in for Primetime Emmy Award for Outstanding Comedy Series along with "Caught in the Act", "The Musical Man" and "Mother's Day".

== Reception ==
=== Ratings ===
In its original American broadcast, "Manny Get Your Gun" was viewed by an estimated 12.092 million households and received a 7.1 rating/11% share Nielsen rating meaning that the episode was watched by an average of 7.1% of households and 11% of all televisions were tuned to the episode when it was broadcast. The episode received a 4.8 rating/13% share among adults between the ages of 18 and 49, tying with the ratings from the previous episode, "Chirp". The episode became the second highest rated scripted series of the week it aired after Glee.

=== Reviews ===
The episode received positive reviews from critics.

Joel Keller of AOL's TV Squad called the episode "one of the better ones of the season". Despite this, he felt that the Mitch and Cam storyline while "funny" it was "not as funny as they usually are". He also commented that "It's just that sometimes Cam is too much Cam for his, or the audience's, own good."

Donna Bowman of The A.V. Club gave the episode an A− rating. She felt "this episode is a bit less than the sum of its parts; or maybe the jigsaw pieces have been forced into place a little too emphatically."

Rachel Maddux of New York gave the episode a positive review. She felt that the episode brought the series "out of [its] slump" and also commented "This kind of episode is pretty much why we started loving this show in the first place".

Kara Klenk of TV Guide called it "another great episode."

Matt Roush called the episode "comic gold" and felt the episode was "firing on all cylinders".

James Poniewozik of Time gave the episode a positive review. He felt that "This episode may not quite have reached the level of "Fizbo", but by the time it built to its near-four-car-pileup, it had strung together quite a run of funny and sweet moments."

HitFix writer Alan Sepinwall, who is often critical of the series's second season praised the episode commenting that "nearly everything was clicking". He also positively compared it to a season one episode of the series when "where everything came together at the end in the style of the strongest season one episodes ".
