= Princess Party =

- Modern Family episode
- Jay (Ed O'Neill) confronting Robby (Matt Dillon) at the party
- Episode no.: Season 2 Episode 15
- Directed by: Michael Spiller
- Written by: Elaine Ko
- Production code: 2ARG17
- Original air date: February 16, 2011

Guest appearances
- Matt Dillon as Robbie Sullivan; Shelley Long as Dede Pritchett; Kate Reinders as Princess

Episode chronology
| ← Previous "Bixby's Back" | Next → "Regrets Only" |
- Modern Family season 2

"Princess Party" is the 15th episode of the American comedy television series, Modern Family's second season and the 39th overall. It originally aired on February 16, 2011, on the American Broadcasting Company (ABC). The episode was written by Elaine Ko and was directed by Michael Spiller.

The episode revolves around the guest list for Lily's princess-themed birthday party which gets a little out of hand when Mitchell decides to invite his mom, much to Claire's dismay, and disinvite Fizbo, much to Cameron's dismay. Things get even more strange when DeDe shows up with Claire's old high school boyfriend in tow, and Jay and Gloria each turn to their own unique methods of dealing with this gathering of misfits.

"Princess Party" received mixed reviews with TV Squad writer Joel Keller calling it "one of the funniest episodes of the season". The episode saw a significant drop in the ratings from the previous episode, "Bixby's Back" which reached a series high.

== Plot ==
At the Dunphy's Claire (Julie Bowen) is going berserk because her mother — grandma DeDe (Shelley Long) — is coming, so Phil (Ty Burrell) is arranging for the children to get off her back and orders Luke (Nolan Gould) to be extra-charming to ward off any unpleasant situation. It turns out that DeDe ran into Robby Sullivan (Matt Dillon), Claire's old boyfriend, and invited him for dinner, without telling him that Claire is now married with children, much to his surprise. Robby is a limo driver who has kept his good looks and taunts Phil. During dinner he starts telling anecdotes of his and Claire's escapades which reveal how much she was out of control when growing up, to the amazement of Phil and amusement of her children. After dinner is finally over, Claire and Phil caught DeDe making out with Robby when he walks her to his limo.

Gloria (Sofía Vergara) comes back home from purchasing Lily's present, a children's book with a recorder where they can record their voices reading the book. She arranges for the entire Pritchett-Delgado family to play the roles with disastrous results just as Jay (Ed O'Neill) had foreseen. Meanwhile, Gloria is very anxious about going to Lily's party the next day, because she does not want to run into DeDe again. This is used by Jay as an excuse to get out of a friend's of Gloria's first communion party because he feels that "the father does not like him very much". However his plan ultimately fails when Gloria rethinks her previous position and decides not to let DeDe prevent her from missing important family events because she knows that Jay will be there for her just as she will be there for him at María Victoria's first communion.

At Mitchell (Jesse Tyler Ferguson) and Cameron's (Eric Stonestreet) they are arranging Lily's birthday and Mitchell is nervous about DeDe's presence there. He has to disinvite Fizbo, much to Cameron's dismay, because it is a "princess-themed-party". At the party Cameron is angry because of the ban on Fizbo and he picks on the hired princess (Kate Reinders) and makes her break character by repeatedly asking how to pay for her services. When the Dunphys arrive Claire lets Mitchell in on all the events that took place after Robby left, namely that he and DeDe disappeared and she left to have breakfast with him. Jay and Gloria arrive, but Gloria is drunk, because she ingested a Xanax with a shot of tequila. DeDe and Robby arrive, which makes Claire and Mitchell angry because they think it is a ploy to taunt them but in reality it is Jay that DeDe is taunting. Claire confronts Robby about kissing her mother and he admits that he had a crush on DeDe while dating her. Later he asks Claire to admit that she is angry at him kissing her mother because she still wants Robby. DeDe overhears this and Claire makes a scene despite Mitchell's intention to keep the party about Lily. Jay finally confronts Robby and makes him leave. DeDe is approached by Jay who admits that she fell for the admiration of a younger man. DeDe does not want to be labeled as the "crazy nana", causing her to end up attacking Gloria. Finally Mitchell agrees that Fizbo is the only salvation of the party.

== Production ==
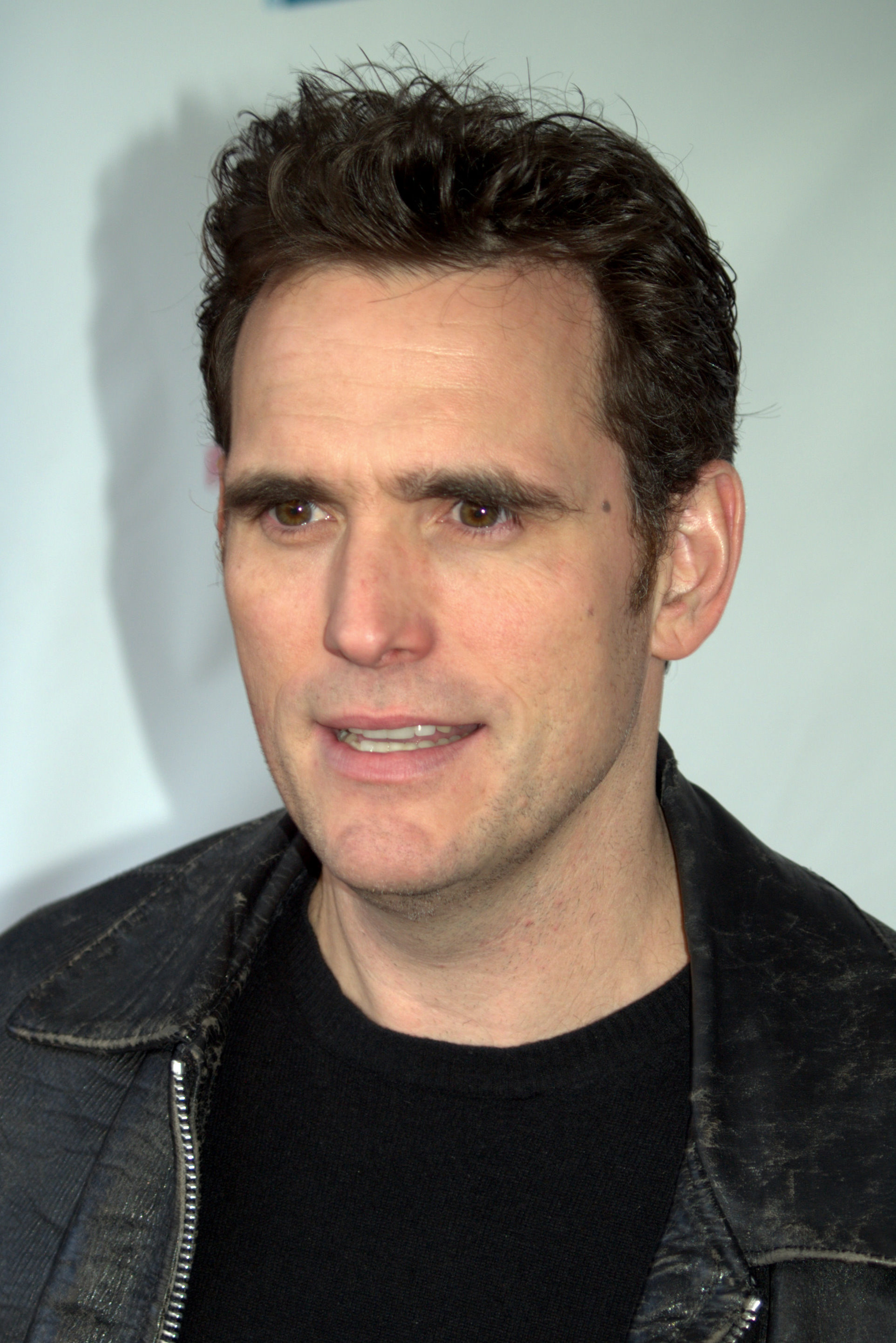
Matt Dillon made a guest appearance as DeDe's new boyfriend.

"Princess Party" was written by Elaine Ko and was directed by Michael Spiller. This episode was Ko's first writing credit for the series and the tenth episode for Spiller. The episode aired on the American Broadcasting Company on February 16, 2011, in the United States as the fifteenth episode of the series' second season and the 39th episode overall. This episode was filmed on January 11 and January 13, 2011.

The episode features the second appearance of Mitchell and Claire's mother, DeDe Pritchett, played by Shelley Long, who previously guest starred on the season one episode, "The Incident". The episode also features the return of Fizbo the Clown and Matt Dillon playing Claire's former high school boyfriend and DeDe's new boyfriend. Matt Dillon's guest spot was originally announced December 2010 by Entertainment Weekly. Dillon filmed his guest appearance on January 11, 2011.

== Reception ==
=== Ratings ===
In its original American broadcast, "Princess Party" was viewed by an estimated 10.453 million households and received a 4.3 rating/12% share among adults between the ages of 18 and 49. This means that it was seen by 4.3% of all 18- to 49-year-olds, and 12% of all 18- to 49-year-olds watching television at the time of the broadcast. This episode of Modern Family saw a 16 percent decrease from the previous episode, "Bixby's Back". Despite this, "Princess Party" was the most-watched scripted show for the week of broadcast among adults aged 18–49, and the twentieth most-watched show among all viewers.

=== Reviews ===
Mitchell and Cam's side plot features much arguing about Fizbo. There isn't an actual appearance by the clown himself [...], which is a relief. Modern Family spent last week's episode somewhat lamely trying to recapture the glory of a better episode from a year ago. When tonight's half-hour began with talk of Fizbo, it came off as an alarming signal that the show was already out of ideas.

— John Teti, The A.V. Club

The episode received mixed reviews from critics many commenting on the return of Shelley Long and Fizbo.

TV Squad writer Joel Keller named the episode "one of the funniest episodes of the season" praising the "subtle fashion" of Fizbo's return. Keller also praised Long's performance, saying she stopped the character from being the "standard sitcom mom".

Rachael Maddux of New York said the episode was a "bit of a letdown", saying that no one of the plot-lines got the "time it deserved."

Alan Sepinwall criticized the show and the episode's use of Multi-camera-like humor, comparing it to a "bad episode" of 30 Rock writing that the episode featured "funny, talented people in front of and behind the camera, and it's not surprising that even a bad episode would have a good joke or three.".

Paste writer Christine Ziemba called the episode "respectable" writing that Long and Dillon were "perfectly fine in their roles", but criticized the fact that "they didn't bring an extra-added spark to the episode". She ultimately gave the episode 7.0/10.

John Teti from The A.V. Club compared the return of Fizbo to last week's critically panned episode, "Bixby's Back" writing that it was "a relief" that Fizbo wasn't featured in the episode. He ultimately gave the episode a B+.
