= The One That Got Away (Modern Family) =

- Modern Family episode
- Mitchell (Jesse Tyler Ferguson) and Claire (Julie Bowen) trapped by a dog at their childhood home
- Episode no.: Season 2 Episode 24
- Directed by: James Bagdonas
- Written by: Paul Corrigan; Brad Walsh; Dan O'Shannon
- Production code: 2ARG23
- Original air date: May 25, 2011

Guest appearance
- Rob Huebel as Glen Whipple

Episode chronology
← Previous "See You Next Fall"	Next → "Dude Ranch"
- Modern Family season 2

"The One That Got Away" is the 24th episode of the second season of the American comedy television series Modern Family, and the 48th episode overall. It is the last episode of season 2. It was originally aired on May 25, 2011. The episode was directed by James Bagdonas and was written by Paul Corrigan, Brad Walsh and Dan O'Shannon.

The episode follows the family trying to create a special day for Jay's birthday, while only he wants is to spend a quiet day fishing. Claire and Mitchell try to recreate a photo of the two of them while they were kids to make a special gift to Jay, Cameron goes to bakery to buy a cake but he gets into trouble, Phil tries to pass Gloria as his wife at the mall when he runs into his college nemesis and the kids try to make a special video as a gift to Jay. Everyone gathers at the house for the birthday, but the dinner ends up a disaster.

The episode received positive reviews from critics.

== Plot ==
It is Jay's (Ed O'Neill) birthday, and all he desires is to have a quiet birthday while fishing on the lake, but the family misinterpret him as wanting a big celebration. In their frantic scramble to put everything together, all they manage to do is to ruin Jay's day who ends up not going fishing.

Claire (Julie Bowen) and Mitchell (Jesse Tyler Ferguson) plan to recreate a photo of the two of them from when they were kids as a gift to Jay. They dress as they were in the photo (Mitchell is dressed as a sailor), and they go to their childhood home to take the picture. When they get there, no one is at home so they decide to climb the fence to take the picture. While trying to take the picture, the owners' dog sees them, and they wind up trapped in the backyard. They end up calling Jay to come and help them.

Meanwhile, Cameron (Eric Stonestreet) goes to the bakery to buy a cake for Jay. Manny (Rico Rodriguez) is on the other side of the line asking for advice for talking to a girl he likes. Cameron is telling him what to say and people at the bakery misinterpret his words, thinking he is talking to an underage girl. While crying, he calls Gloria (Sofía Vergara) to ask her to take the cake, but Jay has mistakenly taken her phone, so Jay is left to buy his own cake.

Phil (Ty Burrell) runs into his old college nemesis, Glen Whipple (Rob Huebel), while at the mall with Gloria and Lily. When Glen keeps making fun of him, he decides to make him think that Gloria is his wife. Glen gets impressed when he sees Gloria, but he tells Phil that he was thinking he had married Claire and that he was jealous of him back in college because he was dating her. Phil realizes how lucky he is for having Claire and smothers her with affection at the party.

Haley (Sarah Hyland), Alex (Ariel Winter) and Luke (Nolan Gould) plan to compile a video of the whole family talking about Jay and wishing him happy birthday. However, the material they have is insufficient, and Luke promises to edit it and make it presentable.

At the end of the episode, the whole family is at Jay and Gloria's home for the birthday dinner. Jay's day at the lake is ruined, Stella drops the cake on the floor and the presents Jay receives are not as they intended. Luke presents the special video, but no one likes it, and it leaves Jay with a headache. Finally, Manny saves the party by making Jay's wish about fishing come true by putting a rowboat in their pool.

The episode ends with Mitchell telling Cameron that he wants a second kid. Cameron immediately agrees, asking if they could adopt a boy this time.

== Production ==
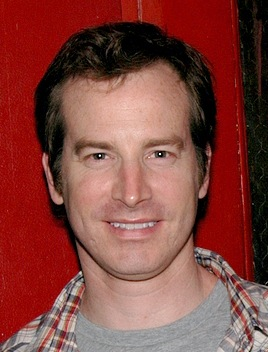
Rob Huebel guest starred in this episode.

"The One That Got Away" was written by Paul Corrigan, Brad Walsh & Dan O'Shannon and was directed by James Bagdonas, his first and only credit for the series. This episode was given a rating of TV-14 L. The episode was filmed on March 9 and March 10, 2011. The episode also features a guest appearance from Rob Huebel as Glen Whipple, Phil's old college nemesis.

== Reception ==
=== Ratings ===
In its original American broadcast on May 25, 2011, "The One That Got Away" was viewed by an estimated 10.31 million households and received a 4.2 rating/11% share among adults between the ages of 18 and 49. This means that it was seen by 4.1% of all 18- to 49-year-olds, and 11% of all 18- to 49-year-olds watching television at the time of the broadcast. This marked a slight rise in the ratings from the previous episode "See You Next Fall" and stayed flat with the first season finale, "Family Portrait". In its timeslot, "See You Next Fall" was defeated by Fox reality series, American Idol which received a 9.2 rating/26% share in the 18–49 demographic. However, the series defeated a rerun episode of CBS crime drama Criminal Minds which received a 1.4 rating/4% share, a rerun episode of the NBC reality series Minute to Win It which received a 1.0 rating/2% share and the season finale of The CW Television Network reality series America's Next Top Model which received a 0.4 rating/2% share. "The One That Got Away" was the second most-watched scripted show for the week of broadcast among adults aged 18–49 after the Glee finale, and was the seventh most-watched show among all viewers. Added with the DVR viewers, the episode received a 6.2 rating in the 18–49 demographic, adding a 2.0 rating to the original viewership.

=== Reviews ===
"The One That Got Away" received mostly positive reviews from critics.

HitFix reviewer Alan Sepinwall gave the episode a positive review, complimenting the episode for having an overlapping theme and plot, unlike previous episodes. He also complimented the writers for featuring "versions of the characters I feel the most affection for" and for using a plot for Cameron that "didn't revolve around him being a whiny, overly-sensitive diva".

Donna Bowman of The A.V. Club compared the episode to "Airport 2010" and "Hawaii" and praised the episode's use of Ed O'Neill and for his character's non-"explosive" reactions to his family planning a birthday party for him. She ultimately gave the episode a B+.

Despite the positive reviews, many critics suggested that the previous episode, "See You Next Fall", would have worked better as the season finale.
