= Norma Michaels =

American actress (1924–2020)

- Born: March 13, 1924; Los Angeles, California, U.S.
- Died: January 11, 2020 (aged 95); Palm Springs, California, U.S.
- Occupations: Television and film actress, therapist

Norma Michaels (March 13, 1924 – January 11, 2020) was an American television and film character actress with a career spanning six decades from her debut in 1954 until 2018. She was best known for portraying an elderly woman on the small screen as "Josephine" on the CBS sitcom The King of Queens. She briefly worked as counselor/therapist during the 1980s.

Born and raised in Los Angeles, she got her break appearing on The Jack Benny Show. Her many television credits included Modern Family, Highway to Heaven, The George Gobel Show, Dr. Kildare, Playing House, 2 Broke Girls and Everybody Loves Raymond. Her film roles included Easy A, Wedding Crashers and Bad Arse, and she also appeared in Hello, My Name Is Doris, where she played the mother of Sally Field's character.

== Filmography ==
Production	Year	Role
The George Gobel Show (TV series)	1954	Patron/episode# 1.2
The Loretta Young Show (TV series)	1960	Nurse - episode The Long Night
Peter Gunn (TV series)	1961	2 roles episode Murder on the Line as - Patient, Deadly Intrusion as - Waitress
The Jack Benny Program (TV series)	1964	Customer
The Incredible Sex Revolution	1965	
The Bill Cosby Show	1971	Episode - The Barber Shop
The Zodiac Killer	1971	Gloria
Those Mad, Mad Moviemakers	1974	U.J.A. Lady
Kojak	1977	Uncredited Episode - The Queen of Hearts is Wild as Mary-Anne
Pale Horse, Pale Rider (film short)	1980	Nurse
Highway to Heaven	1987	Mrs. Belker (episode Ghost Rider)
The Tonight Show with Jay Leno (TVseries)	1992	Various characters
Step by Step (TV series)	1992	Grandma (episode "The Boos")
Land's End (TV series)	1995	Judge (episode's Land's End :Part 1 - Land's End Part 2)
Mr. Show with Bob and David (TV series)	1997	Various characters (episode'sx2 Goin on a Holiday, The Return of the Curse of the Creature's Ghost
It's a Miracle (TV series documentary)	1999	Landlady (episode Football Player Recovers)
Buffy the Vampire Slayer (TV series)	1999	Episode - Dopplegangland as Older Lady
The View from the Swing	2000	Woman in Park (credited as Norma Micheals)
Angel (TV series)	2001	as Aunt Helen
Gilmore Girls (TV series)	1999	Episode Educating Ethan as Elderly Woman
Big Shots	2001	Granny
Malcolm in the Middle (TV series)	2002	Ethel
Ally McBeal (TV series)	1999-2002	Episode's Sex, Lies and Politics - Elderly Woman; -One Hundred Teras - Irene (credited as Norma Micheals)
The Andy Dick Show (TV series)	2002	Grandmother
Go for Broke	2002	Old Later
Grace (film short)	2003	Babi
Everybody Loves Raymond (TV series)	2004	Episode Debra at the Lodge - Mrs. Pechi
Wedding Crashers	2005	Old Irish woman
Medium (TV series)	2006	Episode Doctor's Orders as Medium
Boston Legal (TV series)	2006	Episode Chitty, Chitty Bang Bang as Adele Freeman
Mind of Mencia (TV series)	2005-2006	Grandmother
George Bush Goes to Heaven	2007	Ruth Dakin
The King of Queens (TV series)	2004-2006	Josephine (credited as Norma Micheals)
Las Vegas (TV series)	2007	Mrs. Finnigan
The Darkness (Video Game)	2007	Aunt Sarah (as voice artist)
'Side Order of Life (TV series)	2007	Gert
ICarly (TV series)	2007	Episode - ILikeJake as Jake's Grandmother
Unhitched (TV series)	2008	Old Lady/Older Woman
You Don't Mess with the Zohan	2008	Older Lady at Hair Saloon
Mad Men (TV series	2008	Episode For Those Who Think Young - Older Woman (credited as Norma Micheals)
Happy Hour (TV series)	(2006-2008)	Episode Crazy Girl's as Neighbour (uncredited), The Election as Eleanor (credited as Norma Micheals)
ER (TV series)	2008	Episode Life After Death - Rose Franklin
Leverage (TV series)	2009	Granny- episode The Juror #5 Job (credited as 'Norma Micheals)
Greek (TV series)	2008-2009	Dearly Beloved - Mrs. Baker, The Popular Vote - Mrs. Baker (uncredited)
Rules of Engagement (TV series)	2009	Episode's Voluntary Commitment as Edie Barnett (credited as Norma Micheals), Sex Toy Shop as Old Lady
Acts of Mercy	2009	Rachel
Love at First Hiccup	2009	Upscale Class Elderly Woman
The 41-Year Old Virgin Who Knocked Up Sarah Marshall and Felt Superbad About It (Video)	2010	Old Woman
The Booth at the End (TV series)	2010	Mrs. Tyler
Easy A	2010	Micah's Grandmother (credited as Norma Micheals)
The Defenders	2010	
Modern Family	2010	Episode - Manny Get Your Gun
Days of Our Lives	2010	
CSI: Crime Scene Investigation	2011	
2 Broke Girls	2011	
FCU: Fact Checkers Unit	2011	
Bad Ass	2012	
Melissa & Joey	2012	
Road Show	2013	
Innocent Eyes	2013	
Slightly Single in L.A.	2013	
The Crazy Ones (TV series)	2014	Aunt Sadie (credited as Norma Micheals)
Suburgatory (TV series)	2014	Harriet
Playing House (TV series)	2014	Mrs. Johanssen
The Listing Agent (film short)	2014	Mrs. Gibbs
Hello, My Name Is Doris	2015	Doris' mother
Life in Pieces (TV series)	2015	Mrs Gurney (episode Nanny Tent Earrings Cheeto)
My Land (short film)	2015	La Femme
Angie Tribeca (TV series)	2016	The Famous Ventriloquist Did It Elderly Woman (credited as Norma Micheals)
Emma's Chance	2016	Grandma Bailey
Brooklyn Nine-Nine (TV series)	2016	Mildred Lench - Episode The Night Shift (credited as Norma Micheals - Final small screen role)
High & Outside: A Baseball Noir	2018	Marlene
