= Chirp (Modern Family) =

- Modern Family episode
- Episode no.: Season 2 Episode 7
- Directed by: Michael Spiller
- Written by: Dan O'Shannon
- Production code: 2ARG03
- Original air date: November 3, 2010

Guest appearances
- Reid Ewing as Dylan; Darren Dupree Washington as Director

Episode chronology
← Previous "Halloween"	Next → "Manny Get Your Gun"
- Modern Family season 2

"Chirp" is the seventh episode of the second season of Modern Family and the 31st episode overall. It originally aired on the American Broadcasting Company (ABC) in the United States on November 3, 2010. The episode was written by Dan O'Shannon and directed by season two's main director, Michael Spiller.

In the episode, Claire and Haley are at home sick while Phil tries to find an annoying chirping smoke detector. Gloria and Manny go to Jay's work place much to Jay's dismay and Cameron takes Lily to a commercial shoot against Mitchell's wishes.

"Chirp" received mostly positive reviews. According to the Nielsen Media Research, "Chirp" was seen by 12.21 million viewers and a 4.8 rating/7% share among adults between the ages of 18 and 49, a slight drop from the previous episode. Ariel Winter does not appear in the episode.

== Plot ==
Gloria (Sofía Vergara) and Manny (Rico Rodriguez) go to pick up Jay (Ed O'Neill) from his workplace to take him to a restaurant for lunch. While there one of Jay's employees, Jack (Bryan Krasher), lets Manny handle a forklift which he drives into the wall. Because of the incident, Jay fires Jack, much to Manny's anger and dismay.

Meanwhile, Jay tries to figure out what anniversary Gloria is celebrating today, because she celebrates everything, including their first fight. Jay thinks he has figured what they are celebrating, and therefore where he is to meet Gloria despite Manny's efforts to blackmail Jay into hiring Jack again. Jay maintains that he will not hire Jack back because he almost "hurt [his] kid." Manny, touched by Jay calling him his kid, tells him the real location of the date.

At the Dunphy house, Claire (Julie Bowen) and Haley (Sarah Hyland) get sick and have to stay home. The two initially bond, but soon Dylan (Reid Ewing) calls Haley, making Claire angry. After Dylan hangs up, Claire tries to convince Haley to break up with Dylan and start going out with David a much brighter kid that Claire prefers (albeit without mentioning either name), using one of the useless male characters on All My Children as an example. Unfortunately, Haley thinks Claire is talking about herself and Phil (Ty Burrell).

With Claire sick, Phil takes care of her jobs while trying to find an annoying smoke detector that keeps beeping. Seeing this as a sign he is not man, Phil tries his best to find the smoke detector, to do all of Claire's jobs, and to get his clients back, failing at everything. Soon after replacing the batteries in all the new smoke detectors, Phil uses his old cheerleading baton to destroy a couple of the smoke detectors. He soon realizes that Luke (Nolan Gould) had left the old smoke detectors in the attic last year, and they were the ones that were chirping.

In the meantime, Cameron (Eric Stonestreet) takes Lily to act in a commercial for a children's furniture store, against Mitchell's (Jesse Tyler Ferguson) decision. Adult actors perform voice over for Lily and another Asian child, using stereotypical dubbed-Japanese accents. Mitchell arrives at the studio and confronts Cameron, pointing out that the commercial is racist because it exploits Lily's Asianness and not her acting ability. Cameron initially denies the charge, but then the director brings in the SaveZilla (Godzilla) monster. Cameron asks the director (Darren Dupree Washington) to tone down the stereotypical accents, but the director refuses, saying that it is a satire. Cameron takes Lily away, but not before choosing the wrong Asian child first.

== Production ==
The episode was written by Dan O'Shannon, marking his third writing credit for the series. The episode was directed by Michael Spiller, his sixth director's credit.

The episode is the first of the season to feature Dylan (Reid Ewing), Haley's boyfriend. The episode is the first to mention the late-2000s recession. In an interview with Zap2it, Sarah Hyland said referring to Claire and Haley's storyline, "That's really cute. Me and Julie in bed all day."

== Reception ==
=== Ratings ===
In its original American broadcast, "Chirp" was viewed by an estimated 12.21 million households and received a Nielsen rating of 7.3 rating/12% share meaning that 7.3% of American households watched the episode and that 12% of all televisions in use at the time were watching it. The episode also received a 4.8 rating/13% share among adults between the ages of 18 and 49. The episode slightly dropped in the ratings from "Halloween". The episode also received a 1.4 rating in the 18–49 demographic in DVR adding up to a 6.2 rating in the demographic a 29% rise from the original rating. The show became the third highest rated broadcast program of the week it aired and the highest rated scripted program of the week as well.

=== Reviews ===
The episode featured mostly positive reviews.

Joel Keller of TV Squad stated in his review "'Chirp' only generated one really big laugh for me -- probably because I have a dirty mind" despite this he also stated "it was still a decent episode because both Jay and Phil looked utterly human this week."

Mallika Rao of Entertainment Weekly gave the episode a positive review calling it Phil Dunphy's "strongest showing".

Kara Klenc of TV Guide called it an "enjoyable episode" despite not featuring "zippy one-liners".

Rachael Maddux of New York gave the episode a rather negative review saying "this episode in particular seemed stuck in a rut."

Meredith Blake of the Los Angeles Times gave the episode mostly a positive review saying it felt more "modern" than usual.

The A.V. Club writer Donna Bowman said "even though these three molehill versions took a while to get cranked up, they provide satisfying and even elegant expressions of what the art of Modern Family is all about". Despite this she stated that the Cameron-Mitchell sub-plot didn't have the "ovely ascending—then crashing—arc of the others".
