= Boys' Night =

- Modern Family episode
- Luke (Nolan Gould) makes a new friend (Philip Baker Hall)
- Episode no.: Season 2 Episode 18
- Directed by: Chris Koch
- Written by: Steven Levitan; Jeffrey Richman
- Production code: 2ARG20
- Original air date: March 23, 2011

Guest appearances
- Nathan Lane as Pepper; Philip Baker Hall as Walt Kleezak; Reid Ewing as Dylan; Kevin Daniels as Longines; Craig Zimmerman as Crispin

Episode chronology
| ← Previous "Two Monkeys and a Panda" | Next → "The Musical Man" |
- Modern Family season 2

"Boys' Night" is the 18th episode of the American comedy television series, Modern Family's second season and the 42nd episode overall. It was originally aired on March 23, 2011. The episode was written by series co-creator Steven Levitan and Jeffrey Richman, and was directed by Chris Koch.

It featured the return appearance of Nathan Lane as Pepper Saltsman, who previously guest starred on "Earthquake". It also featured a guest appearance by Philip Baker Hall as Walt Kleezak, Luke's elderly friend.

In the episode, Phil and Claire are fearful when they find out that Luke has befriended their old and presumably horrid neighbor, Mr. Kleezak. Jay tries to avoid sitting through a symphony concert with Gloria and Manny, but unfortunately is pressured to hang out with Mitchell and Cameron on their "boys' night out", while Haley is babysitting Lily.

"Boys' Night" received generally positive reviews from critics with many praising Lane and Hall's performances. The episode was viewed by 10.89 million households, according to the Nielsen Media Research, and received a 4.4 rating/12% share in the 18–49 demographic, making it the highest-rated scripted program the original week it aired.

== Plot ==
Phil (Ty Burrell) and Claire (Julie Bowen) are fearful when they find out that Luke (Nolan Gould) has befriended their presumably horrid and old neighbor, Mr. Walt Kleezak (Philip Baker Hall). They find Luke's friendship with him strange and they forbid the two to spend time together again, much to the upset of Luke. They decide to go over to Walt's to talk to him about it, but after they terrify him and wake him up from a deep sleep, in which they thought he was dead, they leave. Walt later knocks on their door and explains to them that he used to be a firefighter and that he wouldn't hurt a kid. Claire and Phil then allow Luke to spend time with Walt again.

Jay (Ed O'Neill) avoids sitting through a symphony concert with Gloria (Sofía Vergara) and Manny (Rico Rodriguez), but soon after is called over to hang out with Mitchell (Jesse Tyler Ferguson), Cameron (Eric Stonestreet) and their friends on their "boys' night out". Jay ends up enjoying his time with them and whilst drunk, agrees to go out shopping with Pepper (Nathan Lane), which he is forced to do the following day when Gloria refuses to give him an excuse to get out of it.

Haley (Sarah Hyland) babysits Lily at Mitchell and Cam's while they are out with their friends, and sneaks Dylan (Reid Ewing) in, despite the fact visitors are not allowed. Cameron has set up the web camera from the laptop to "spy" on her because he does not trust her watching over Lily. He also sees Dylan and he calls home, but Haley covers it up. She is later caught though when Dylan leaves without his shoes and Cameron finds them when he comes back home. Haley goes back to take them the next morning and asks Cameron not to tell her mother.

== Production ==
"Boys' Night" was written by Modern Family co-creator and executive producer, Steven Levitan and Jeffrey Richman. This episode marks Levitan and Richman's second script collaboration, having co-written "Caught in the Act". The episode was also directed by Chris Koch. This marked his fourth directors credit for the series. This episode of Modern Family was filmed on February 8, and February 10, 2011. The episode marks the second appearance of Nathan Lane as Cameron's ex-boyfriend, Pepper Saltsman. He previously appeared on "Earthquake". The episode also featured a guest appearance by Philip Baker Hall as Walt Kleezak.

== Reception ==
=== Ratings ===
In its original American broadcast, "Boys' Night" was viewed by an estimated 10.897 million households and received a 4.4 rating/12% share among adults between the ages of 18 and 49 This means that it was seen by 4.4% of all 18- to 49-year-olds, and 12% of all 18- to 49-year-olds watching television at the time of the broadcast. The episode received a 2% rise in the ratings from the previous episode, "Two Monkeys and a Panda". "Boys' Night" was the most-watched scripted show for the week of broadcast among adults aged 18–49, and the thirteenth most-watched show among all viewers.

=== Reviews ===
The episode received mostly positive reviews from critics with many praising Hall and Lane's performance.

TV Squad writer Joel Keller gave the episode a positive review calling it "solid" and also praised Hall's performance writing that it "he's more grouchy than funny, but it works".

The A.V. Club's Donna Bowman praised the episode's combination of sitcom tropes and plots that took "new directions". She gave the episode a B+ rate.

Lesley Savage of Entertainment Weekly said that while it wasn't "the best episode yet, it was definitely strong". She also praised Lane and Hall's performance saying that they had "two fantastic cameos" and called Lane's character "always great, and never quite enough".
