= The Musical Man =

- Modern Family episode
- Cameron (Eric Stonestreet) as interim music director at Luke (Nolan Gould) and Manny's (Rico Rodriguez) school
- Episode no.: Season 2 Episode 19
- Directed by: Michael Spiller
- Written by: Paul Corrigan; Brad Walsh
- Production code: 2ARG19
- Original air date: April 13, 2011

Guest appearance
- Jonathan Banks as Donnie Pritchett

Episode chronology
← Previous "Boys' Night"	Next → "Someone to Watch Over Lily"
- Modern Family season 2

"The Musical Man" is the 19th episode of the American comedy television series, Modern Family's second season and the 43rd episode overall. It originally aired on April 13, 2011 on American Broadcasting Company (ABC). The episode was written by Paul Corrigan and Brad Walsh and was directed by Michael Spiller.

In the episode, Cameron takes control of the spring musical at Luke and Manny's school, while Jay's brother pays him a visit, and Phil tries to get the family to be in his new real estate advertisement.

"The Musical Man" received mixed reviews from critics. According to Nielsen Media Research, the episode was viewed by 9.6 million households and received a 3.9 rating/10% share in the 18-49 demographic marking a fourteen percent drop in the ratings from the previous episode, "Boys' Night".

== Plot ==
At the Pritchett-Delgados', Jay (Ed O'Neill) is expecting Donnie (Jonathan Banks), his brother, to arrive for a visit. He is preparing a prank involving a picture of his butt. When Donnie arrives the two get into a friendly fight, which foils Jay's plan involving his picture. All day long, Jay continues arranging pranks on his brother over Gloria's (Sofía Vergara) protests. Gloria berates Jay, claiming that Jay and his brother do not really know each other after Jay does not recognize Donnie's granddaughter and does not even know where Donnie lives. Jay tries to get closer to Donnie, but Donnie assumes that his wife Irene had told Jay about Donnie's recent diagnosis with prostate cancer. Donnie accuses Jay of treating him differently because he has cancer, but this news deeply affects Jay, who had not known, and Donnie asks him to keep it a secret.

Phil (Ty Burrell) has had a poster made with a picture of his entire family and has had the family van wrapped in order to advertise his real estate business, saying that his best assets are his family and his teeth, both of which can be seen in an ad that reads "I can't be satisfied until you're satisfied, let me make your dreams come true."

Haley's (Sarah Hyland) SAT scores are posted on the Internet; the scores turn out to be average, granting her possibilities at numerous colleges, but she shocks her parents by telling them that she does not want to go to college, much to Alex's (Ariel Winter) delight. Claire (Julie Bowen) then arranges to have lunch with Haley and use the opportunity to talk her into going to college. As they climb into the newly wrapped van, they fail to notice that the advertisement in its wrapped form shows Claire under the motto "I can't be satisfied", while the side with Haley's photo reads only "Let me make your dreams come true." Claire uses the opportunity to talk very positively about college life, causing her to begin to wonder if her best years are behind her.

Meanwhile, Phil has had many calls asking about the ad, but he makes such general references about what he is advertising that his callers still believe that he is selling sex services. Alex lets him know about the true intention of the callers after receiving an e-mailed photo of the van. At that same moment Claire calls, and Phil realizes that she has not seen the ad yet, so he runs to the school where he will be meeting Claire for Luke (Nolan Gould) and Manny's (Rico Rodriguez) show.

All the while, Cameron (Eric Stonestreet) is loving his role as interim music director at Luke and Manny's school, and he is taking on the upcoming spring musical performance with a little too much zest and fervor. After being pitched with the new songs that Cameron made for the show, Mitchell (Jesse Tyler Ferguson) criticizes that they are too complicated for the kids to learn by that night, which bothers Cameron. Mitchell then promises that he will always be supportive no matter what.

During rehearsals Manny asks Mitchell to deal with Cameron and his overbearing production. Mitchell refuses, but he does tell Manny what to say to Cameron, who at the end does not listen to the kids and imposes his show on them. The closing of the show involves the kids displaying letters that form the phrase "We love the world", and the letter "F" (representing Franklin Middle School) coming down from the sky. When the show starts, the kids are exhausted but continue with it, but things start to go awry when Luke cannot land because the machinery gets stuck, and the props start to fall over.

During the show Donnie starts playing pranks on Jay, which infuriates Gloria in such a manner that she hits Donnie, but Jay asks her not to do so because Donnie has cancer. Donnie walks out the auditorium followed by Jay, who wants to apologize. Donnie tells his brother that the reason he did not tell him is because he did not want to be treated differently because he gets enough of it at home, so they go back to their old rough ways. Meanwhile, Mitchell goes outside of the auditorium to scream all the objections that he has on the show and recomposes himself to go back and support Cameron.

The show still goes on with a number of mishaps, including an accident involving Joan of Arc and a fire extinguisher. As the finale comes up, the kids raise their letters but since Luke is stuck still hovering over the world, the phrase reads "We love the word", which turns worse when the "F" comes down, ending with the phrase "We love the F word." Among a shocked audience, the only one enthusiastically clapping is Mitchell while Jay gives a vague smile and Donnie and Haley are the only ones who laugh.

As everyone leaves, Claire discovers that Phil has disappeared and has been trying to rip the wrapping off with no success, so she finally sees the reason why men have been honking at her all day long. Her anger is somewhat appeased, however, when Phil tells her that out of 30 calls, about 20 to 25 were for the "hot blonde", assuring her that her best years are not over.

== Production ==
"The Musical Man" was written by Paul Corrigan and Brad Walsh. This episode marked their seventh script collaboration. The episode was directed by Michael Spiller his twelfth directing credit for the series. It features the first appearance of Jonathan Banks as Jay's brother, Donnie. The episode was filmed between February 1, and February 2, 2011.

== Reception ==
=== Ratings ===
In its original American broadcast, "The Musical Man" was viewed by an estimated 9.608 million households and received a 3.9 rating/10% share among adults between the ages of 18 and 49. This marked a fourteen percent drop in the ratings from the previous episode, "Boys' Night" and made it the lowest rated episode of the second season. Despite this, it became the second highest rated program on Wednesday after American Idol. The episode also became the third highest rated scripted program of the week behind NCIS and The Office.

=== Reviews ===
The episode received mixed reviews from critics.

TV Squad writer Joel Keller called the episode "one of the best episodes of the season" praising the show's use of character humor writing that "a show can slide into after almost two high-ly-acclaimed seasons." He also praised the ending featuring the kids holding up the sign "We Love The F Word" writing that "it was one of those classic farcical moments where every little element came together to a really funny crescendo." New York's Rachel Maddux wrote that while two storylines were funny one felt "tacked on" commenting that it felt "like a bad fake beard in a school play that you really want to watch but can't because two old dudes are fighting outside the gymnatorium".

Christine Ziemba of Paste wrote that the episode "tried to cram in way too much for its three storylines" and mainly criticized Cameron and Mitchell's plotline writing that "[the plot] was supposed to be the focal point of the episode, but it fell flat". She ultimately rated it a 6.7/10, calling it a "respectable" episode.
