= Mother's Day (Modern Family) =

- Modern Family episode
- Jay's (Ed O'Neill) moment of weakness when Phil (Ty Burrell) finds the poem Jay wrote for his mom
- Episode no.: Season 2 Episode 21
- Directed by: Michael Spiller
- Written by: Dan O'Shannon; Ilana Wernick
- Production code: 2ARG21
- Original air date: May 4, 2011

Guest appearances
- Todd Weeks as Rick; Jean Villepique as Jen

Episode chronology
← Previous "Someone to Watch Over Lily"	Next → "Good Cop Bad Dog"
- Modern Family season 2

"Mother's Day" is the 21st episode of the American comedy television series, Modern Family's second season and the 45th episode overall of the series. It originally aired on the American Broadcasting Company (ABC) on May 4, 2011. The episode was written by Dan O'Shannon & Ilana Wernick and was directed by Michael Spiller.

In the episode, Claire and Gloria's Mother's Day excursion outdoors with the kids turns into the mother of all disasters. Meanwhile, Phil and Jay share an awkward moment after Jay finds a letter he wrote to his mom on a past Mother's Day when they stay home to prepare dinner for everyone; and Mitchell attempts to show his appreciation for Cameron by bringing him breakfast in bed on Mother's Day, causing Cameron to worry about the gender roles in his relationship with Mitchell.

"Mother's Day" received positive reviews from critics with Alan Sepinwall, who is usually critical of the series, calling Ed O'Neill's performance "terrific". The episode also marked a rise in the ratings from the previous episode, "Someone to Watch Over Lily". The episode also ranked as the highest-rated scripted program on Wednesday.

== Plot ==
Claire (Julie Bowen) and Gloria (Sofía Vergara) want to spend this year's Mother's Day outdoors hiking with the kids, but the bickering and complaining drives Claire and Gloria to the edge. Both of them can not hear them complaining anymore, so they leave them back waiting for the two of them to finish their hiking and then go back home. While they are hiking, Claire convinces Gloria to admit that even Manny (Rico Rodriguez) drives her crazy sometimes. Gloria says that sometimes she needs her own space and that Manny should go out and play with other kids. She also says that Manny's poetry is not that good, something that Manny overhears since he followed them on the hiking. Manny gets upset and Gloria tries to make things right.

In the meantime, Haley (Sarah Hyland), Alex (Ariel Winter) and Luke (Nolan Gould) while they are waiting for the others to come back, they realize that Claire is always trying to make them feel guilty as a way to apologize to her. They decide that this time they will not do it because if they do, they will let her win once again.

Meanwhile, Phil (Ty Burrell) and Jay (Ed O'Neill) stay home to cook a nice dinner for the family. They are making a special recipe that Jay's mom used to make. Things get really awkward when Phil finds a poem Jay wrote for his mom when he was nine years old and when he reads it out loud he witnesses an unexpected emotional reaction from Jay.

In the Tucker-Pritchett house, Mitchell (Jesse Tyler Ferguson) attempts to show his appreciation for Cameron (Eric Stonestreet) by bringing him breakfast in bed on Mother's Day, causing Cameron to worry about the gender roles in his relationship with Mitchell. Things get worse when later, while visiting the park, all the other families treat Cameron as him being the mother of Lily as well.

At the end of the episode, the whole family gathers for the special dinner Jay and Phil prepared. Phil tells everyone that Jay cried while they were cooking because he remembered his mom, something that makes Jay mad and denies that he was crying. During the dinner though, while Jay is trying to tell a story about his mom, he starts crying again and everyone comes to hug him. Haley and Alex, seeing Jay crying, apologize to Claire for destroying her special day.

== Production ==
"Mother's Day" was written by Dan O'Shannon and Ilana Wernick, marking the former's sixth writing credit and the latter's fourth writing credit. The episode was also directed by Michael Spiller, his fourteenth credit for the series. "Mother's Day" featured guest appearances from Jean Villepique as Jennifer and Todd Weeks as Roy, Mitchell and Cameron's friends. Following the episode's airdate, ABC allowed fans to make a personalized Mother's Day E-card. Modern Family co-creator Steven Levitan called the episode "one of our best this season" on Twitter. The episode was later put in for Primetime Emmy Award for Outstanding Comedy Series along with "The Old Wagon", "The Kiss", "Halloween", "Caught in the Act" and "Someone to Watch Over Lily".

== Reception ==
=== Ratings ===
In its original American broadcast, "Mother's Day" was viewed by an estimated 9.90 million households and received a 3.9 rating/10% share among adults between the ages of 18 and 49. This means that it was seen by 3.9% of all 18- to 49-year-olds, and 10% of all 18- to 49-year-olds watching television at the time of the broadcast. This marked a slight rise in the ratings from the previous episode, "Someone to Watch Over Lily". "Mother's Day" was the most-watched scripted show for the week of broadcast among adults aged 18–49, and the twenty-first most-watched show among all viewers.

=== Reviews ===
Jay's outburst at the dinner table worked really really well. Part of it is that the show played it for laughs, paying off earlier subplots involving the Dunphy kids and Phil's desire to bond with Jay, but the actual heart managed to co-exist with the jokes.

— Alan Sepinwall, HitFix

The episode received mostly positive reviews from critics.

The A.V. Club writer Joshua Alston called the episode "darn good 'Mother's Day' overall". He mainly praised the writers for changing Phil and Jay's relationship, calling it "a welcome change." He ultimately gave the episode a B+.

Aly Semigran of Entertainment Weekly called the episode "funny and touching", writing that "This may not go down as one of the all-time greats of Modern Family, but a satisfying episode it most certainly was."

Meredith Blake of The Los Angeles Times praised the writers on changing the Mitchell and Cameron's storyline, commenting, "I'm happy that this week, Modern Family delivered a Cameron-Mitchell storyline that was insightful, funny and maybe even a little brave.". TV Squad writer Joel Keller gave the episode a mostly positive review, but criticized the episode for not reaching its potential. He wrote: "it's one of those things that's hard to put a finger on; it could be that most of the plots were a series of funny events in search of an ending, but it was mostly because they simply weren't as funny as they could be."

HitFix writer Alan Sepinwall wrote that while the episode didn't live up to the previous episode, praised Jay's outburst at the dinner table and the writers for playing the other plots of it and called O'Neill's performance "terrific".

Christine N. Ziemba of Paste wrote that while "Modern Family had some great one-liners in this episode" she concluded that "with such a loaded and promising premise, “Mother’s Day” was brought down a notch by a hiking storyline that was dead before reaching the trailhead." She ultimately gave it a 7.1/10 calling it "respectable".
