= Regrets Only =

- Modern Family episode
- Claire (Julie Bowen) talking to Jay (Ed O'Neill) about her fight with Phil (Ty Burrell) while eating ice-cream at the Mall
- Episode no.: Season 2 Episode 16
- Directed by: Dean Parisot
- Written by: Abraham Higginbotham
- Production code: 2ARG14
- Original air date: February 23, 2011

Guest appearance
- Jeremy Scott Johnson as Andrew

Episode chronology
← Previous "Princess Party"	Next → "Two Monkeys and a Panda"
- Modern Family season 2

"Regrets Only" is the 16th episode of the second season of the American sitcom Modern Family, and the series' 40th episode overall. It aired on February 23, 2011, on ABC. The episode was written by Abraham Higginbotham and directed by Dean Parisot.

In the episode, Jay buys a karaoke machine as a gift to Gloria, something that he regrets when it becomes clear that Gloria's singing voice is glaringly off key. Phil and Claire deal with the aftermath of a huge fight, though neither of them come to understand how it started. Haley tries to trick her parents into saving money to buy her a car, a motive that her sister Alex deduces. Cameron tries to arrange a fundraiser that will help him upstage his "nemesis" Andrew.

The episode's original American broadcast was viewed by an estimated 10.35 million households and received a 4.1 rating and got mixed reviews from the critics.

== Plot ==
At the Dunphy house, Claire (Julie Bowen) has spent the night on the couch after having a huge fight with Phil (Ty Burrell), but he has no clue as to what it was about. Meanwhile, Jay (Ed O'Neill) gives Gloria (Sofía Vergara) a karaoke machine as a gift that he ends up regretting because of Gloria's loud and off key singing. Cameron (Eric Stonestreet) is trying to arrange for a very important fundraiser that gives him the chance to upstage his "nemesis" Andrew (Jeremy Scott Johnson).

Jay comes to the Dunphy house to help them fix the microwave oven door which was torn apart during Phil and Claire's fight, but the official version of the disaster in the kitchen is that a raccoon came in through the dog trap door and Claire had to fight it off with a fire extinguisher. Since Jay is unable to fix the oven, Claire asks Phil to take her to the mall to buy a new one but he says that he was on his way to have a hair cut as an excuse to avoid going to the mall with Claire. Gloria volunteers to cut Phil's hair and Jay agrees to take Claire to the mall as an excuse to avoid having to videotape Gloria singing on the karaoke machine.

While having his hair cut, Phil talks with Gloria about the fight and they try to figure out what caused it. He and Gloria come to the conclusion that the fight maybe was about him mistakenly buying broccoli instead of cauliflower. In the mall Jay discovers why Phil declined to come with Claire. While getting a massage, Claire makes all kinds of loud and embarrassing noises. While eating ice cream Claire tells her side of the story and it turns out that Phil went to lunch with a friend and had an amazing salad that he loved which Claire had been telling him about for years but he never tried. She left to walk around the block after having a meltdown and throwing the broccoli at Phil, but as she walked out the door her night gown got caught in the door and she had to get back into the house through the dog trap door, which Phil confused with a raccoon and he was the one to attack her with the fire extinguisher.

Meanwhile Haley (Sarah Hyland) has been "working" as a waitress and getting always just under $60.00 in tips. However Alex (Ariel Winter) figures that Haley is tricking her parents after Manny (Rico Rodriguez) tells her that he has passed by the restaurant and Haley was absent from work, since her parents are matching her tips in order to buy a car and she has been flashing the same $60.00 over and over again. She arranges that the family go for dinner at the restaurant and texts Haley to tell her. Once in the restaurant Haley tells them that there are no tables left but Alex called to make a reservation. Haley "takes" their drink order, as it turns out she has a table of her own and she orders everything on her own tab. Phil is trying to undo everything that might have caused the fight of the night before but when the menus arrive he tells Claire about the salad and she has a new meltdown and storms out of the restaurant. Haley uses this opportunity to "get fired" after her mother's outburst, foiling Alex's plan to expose her as a fake.

Cameron is gloating about the event that he is preparing with a harp duo called "Harp attack", since there have been no cancellations so far, but Mitchell (Jesse Tyler Ferguson) finds in the back of his car all the invitations that he was supposed to have sent but never did. He tells nothing to Cameron and tries to have as many people come by asking them over the phone, but since there is a similar event on the same evening many are already engaged.

Cameron has hired Luke (Nolan Gould) to help to arrange his musical soirée and he gets a call from his friend Longines, who he asks for a couple of chairs. During that conversation he learns that no invitations were sent. He calls Mitchell over the phone and orders him to fix it. Mitchell calls everyone he knows and manages to bring a few people to the event, which turns out to be double the attendance of Andrew's event the year before.

Meanwhile, Phil shows Claire a photo album of pictures from when they just started dating. He shows that he has changed a lot as a result of her advice and that he does listen to her.

Gloria has learned a new song and is about to try it on the karaoke machine. As Jay is about to tell her that he can no longer take it, Manny runs in and begs his mother to stop it, that the machine will destroy their family and accuses Jay of cowardice.

In the epilogue, Jay tries out the karaoke machine and does a surprisingly good rendition of "Danny Boy", but it suddenly stops when Manny unplugs it and threatens Jay with, "You keep this up, and this won't be the last plug I pull."

== Reception ==
=== Ratings ===
In its original American broadcast, "Regrets Only" was viewed by an estimated 10.35 million households and received a 4.1 rating/11% share among adults between the ages of 18 and 49. This marked a season low for the series. Despite this the episode became Wednesday's highest rated scripted program.

=== Reviews ===
The episode received mixed reviews.

TV Squad writer Joel Keller praised the episode for mixing up the three families writing that "the humor was rooted in the comedy of recognition that got 'Modern Family' all those Emmys last year."

John Teti from The A.V. Club gave a B− rate to the episode saying that clichés are not necessarily a problem when they are executed in fresh ways, but sometimes tired is tired. He stated though that Mitchell and Cameron's storyline is the bright spot of the night and doesn't need to be saved. "Sometimes, tired is tired. A couple having an argument while the man doesn’t know what it’s about is tired. A wacky character with a terrible singing voice—except she doesn’t realize it, and she just loves to sing!—is tired. No amount of stylish storytelling is going to save these musty tropes. At least, it doesn’t tonight."

Christine N. Ziemba from Paste Magazine rated the episode with 8.4/10 saying that for the first time on awhile the show didn't pull any punches with the jokes. "There were many more belly laughs in this episode that in the previous two combined, with great writing and perfect delivery by the cast. The use of physical comedy and quick delivery balanced against the pauses and imploring stares into the camera went a long way. A hat tip to this week’s scene stealers: Bowen, Burrell and O’Neill. We’ll see if the show can top itself next week."

Matt Richenthal from TV Fanatic gave 3/5 to the episode saying that for the first time in memory, when it comes to that show, he didn't laugh out loud. "For a few weeks, the series has been teetering close to feeling like a regular sitcom. Sadly, it fell off that edge here, courtesy of a confluence of cliches [sic] and set-ups that I've seen a million times before."
