= Luetkemeyer (surname) =

Luetkemeyer is a surname. Notable people with the surname include:

- Annie Luetkemeyer, American physician
- Blaine Luetkemeyer (born 1953), American politician
- John Luetkemeyer (1910-1998), American politician
- Julie Bowen (née Luetkemeyer) (born 1970), American actress
- Tony Luetkemeyer (born 1983), American politician
