= 1950 Maryland Comptroller election =

- November 7, 1950
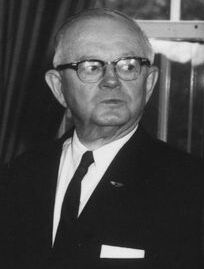
Nominee	J. Millard Tawes
Party	Democratic
Popular vote	339,799
Percentage	100.00%
- County results Tawes: 90–100%
Comptroller before election
J. Millard Tawes (Acting)
Democratic
Elected Comptroller
J. Millard Tawes
Democratic

The 1950 Maryland comptroller election was held on November 7, 1950, in order to elect the comptroller of Maryland. Democratic nominee and incumbent acting comptroller J. Millard Tawes won the election as he ran unopposed.

== General election ==
On election day, November 7, 1950, Democratic nominee J. Millard Tawes won the election as he ran unopposed, thereby retaining Democratic control over the office of comptroller. Tawes was sworn in for his third full term on January 3, 1951.

=== Results ===
Maryland Comptroller election, 1950
Party	Candidate	Votes	%
Democratic	J. Millard Tawes (incumbent)	339,799	100.00
Total votes		339,799	100.00
Democratic hold			
