= Unplugged (Modern Family) =

- Modern Family episode
- Manny (Rico Rodriguez) and Jay (Ed O'Neill) trying to figure out what Gloria (Sofia Vergara) did with the neighbors' dog
- Episode no.: Season 2 Episode 5
- Directed by: Michael Spiller
- Written by: Steven Levitan
- Production code: 2ARG06
- Original air date: October 20, 2010

Guest appearances
- Michael Rothhaar as Larry Paulson; Carla Renata as Nikki; Taylor Nichols as Mr. Plympton

Episode chronology
← Previous "Strangers on a Treadmill"	Next → "Halloween"
- Modern Family season 2

"Unplugged" is the fifth episode of the second season of the ABC sitcom, Modern Family, and the 29th episode of the series overall. The episode originally aired October 20, 2010. It was written by series co-creator Steven Levitan and directed by Michael Spiller.

The episode follows Phil, Claire and the kids trying to improve their communication skills by giving up their electronic devices. Gloria is getting obsessed over a neighbor's barking dog while Mitchell and Cameron try to find a preschool for Lily.

"Unplugged" received a mix of critical acclaim and negative reviews. The episode also received controversy in Peru because of a line of dialogue of Vergara's character in which she relates Peruvians with violence. According to the Nielsen Media Research the episode received a 4.7 rating/13% share in the 18-49 demographic going down a tick from the previous episode, "Strangers on a Treadmill"

== Plot ==
After getting tired of the over use of electronic gadgets at the table, Claire (Julie Bowen) and Phil (Ty Burrell) declare that no one is allowed to use electronics except the TV for a week. However, Phil turns it into a contest much to Claire's annoyance, and offers prizes: A car for Haley (Sarah Hyland), a new computer for Alex (Ariel Winter) and a chicken pot pie for Luke (Nolan Gould). Alex and Luke quickly give up leaving Phil, Claire and Haley in the contest.

Claire soon gets tired of calling to check on reservations to go see Phil's family and uses the computer before getting caught. Not long after, Claire and Phil catch Haley talking on the phone which prompts Phil to use the computer right away. However, Haley reveals to them she was only talking to a fake phone that she carved out of a bar of soap and colored black. As she celebrates that she is getting a new car, she is informed that her parents were bluffing.

The Pritchetts get annoyed by a neighbor's dog and go next door to see if he will shut the dog up. The neighbor says that the dog belongs to his soon-to-be-ex-wife, and that she will not be coming back for it. He also demands that they shut their parrot up (he had mistaken Gloria's high pitched voice with the squawking of a parrot).

Suddenly the dog goes missing, and Jay (Ed O'Neill) assumes that Gloria (Sofía Vergara) killed it (her family in Colombia were butchers so she is very used to killing animals, as Jay had previously witnessed her kill a rat in the house with a shovel). He asks Manny (Rico Rodriguez) if he thinks she did anything, which he initially denies. At night, Jay and Manny go to the garage to look for evidence of the dog's murder. Manny rats out Jay's plan to Gloria, making her very angry. Gloria tells Jay that she gave the dog to a friend for a jar of pickles. To make her happy, Jay buys plane tickets to Colombia to see what her village is like. She says in an interview she does not want to go to her old village as it will prove Jay right.

Meanwhile, Mitchell (Jesse Tyler Ferguson) and Cameron (Eric Stonestreet) learn that all of Lily's friends have been put in preschool causing the couple to panic. Mitchell calls Claire to see if Wagon Wheel is a good school and asks her if she can get them an appointment. At Wagon Wheel the assistant tells them with their diversity (Mitchell and Cameron being gay and Lily being Asian) they can get into any preschool. Mitchell starts calling Cameron his life partner to seem even more diverse to make it into Billingsley, the expensive school nicknamed "the Harvard of preschools." They soon become beaten at their own game by an interracial, disabled lesbian couple with an adopted African American child. Cameron pretends to be one sixteenth Cherokee to seem more diverse in their interview. They eventually decide to go to Wagon Wheel after bombing the interview.

== Production ==
The episode was written by co-creator, Steven Levitan & directed by Michael Spiller. The episode alluded to a trip to Colombia that the cast (especially Sofía Vergara) had been hoping the producers would announce. The episode would serve as a sequel to "Hawaii".

== Reception ==
=== Ratings ===
In its original American broadcast, "Unplugged" was viewed by an estimated 11.972 million households without DVR viewership making it the third most viewed program of the night. The episode received a 7.1 rating/11% share among overall viewers and a 4.7 rating/13% share among adults between the ages of 18 and 49 leading its timeslot in the demographic and becoming second in its timeslot for total viewership. If you were to include DVR viewership, the episode was watched by 14.82 million viewers and received a 6.2 rating among adults between the ages of 18 and 49. The episode went down a tick from the previous episode, "Strangers on a Treadmill". Despite dropping in the demographic the series became the highest rated scripted series of the week between October 17 and October 23.

=== Reviews ===
The episode received mostly positive reviews.

Jason Hughes of AOL's TV Squad stated in his review "While 'Modern Family' is consistently one of the funniest half hours on television, it's rarely as well-balanced as this episode."

Michael Slezak of Entertainment Weekly gave the episode a positive review. Despite feeling it didn't have a "mushy center" he also felt "it's Modern Family's balancing act between the absurd and the relatable that has made it a sitcom for the ages."

Kara Klenc of TV Guide called the episode "laugh out loud". She also stated "I laughed out loud at so many moments of this episode, there are barely any shows that can do that anymore!"

Henry Hanks of CNN gave the episode a positive review and also stated "This week, all three plots were equally strong, but I have to admit, I'm really looking forward to next week's Halloween episode even more."

Mickey O'Conner of TV Guide named Cameron and Mitchell's interview the fifth best TV moment of the week.

Matt Roush gave the episode a positive review. Despite criticizing the writers "painting" Mitchell as a "shallow social climber" he also stated "that the storyline is quickly redeemed in yet another hilarious episode".

Despite these positive reviews Brett Singer of The A.V. Club rated the episode with a B−. He felt the episode was "rushed" due to the plotlines not "overlapping".

Alan Sepinwall of HitFix gave the episode a negative review as well saying "I didn't laugh at the Dunphy plot" and "I hated hated hated the Cam/Mitchell plot", but also praised the Pritchett plot.

=== Peruvian controversy ===
The episode received controversy for Gloria's statement "Ah, here we go. Because, in Colombia, we trip over goats and we kill people in the street. Do you know how offensive that is? Like we’re Peruvians!" Milagros Lizarraga, founder of the online group Peru USA Southern Ca, told the Associated Press, “It’s incredible that in a country where everything is politically correct, ABC would have a line of this sort.”
