= 1942 Maryland Comptroller election =

- November 3, 1942
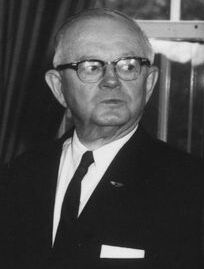
Nominee	J. Millard Tawes
Party	Democratic
Popular vote	208,443
Percentage	100.00%
- County results Tawes: 90–100%
Comptroller before election
J. Millard Tawes
Democratic
Elected Comptroller
J. Millard Tawes
Democratic

The 1942 Maryland comptroller election was held on November 3, 1942, in order to elect the comptroller of Maryland. Democratic nominee and incumbent comptroller J. Millard Tawes won re-election as he ran unopposed.

== General election ==
On election day, November 3, 1942, Democratic nominee J. Millard Tawes won re-election as he ran unopposed, thereby retaining Democratic control over the office of comptroller. Tawes was sworn in for his second term on January 3, 1943.

=== Results ===
Maryland Comptroller election, 1942
Party	Candidate	Votes	%
Democratic	J. Millard Tawes (incumbent)	208,443	100.00
Total votes		208,443	100.00
Democratic hold			
