= 1958 Maryland gubernatorial election =

- November 4, 1958
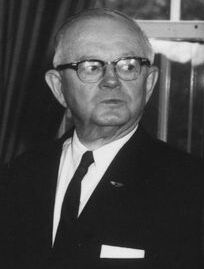

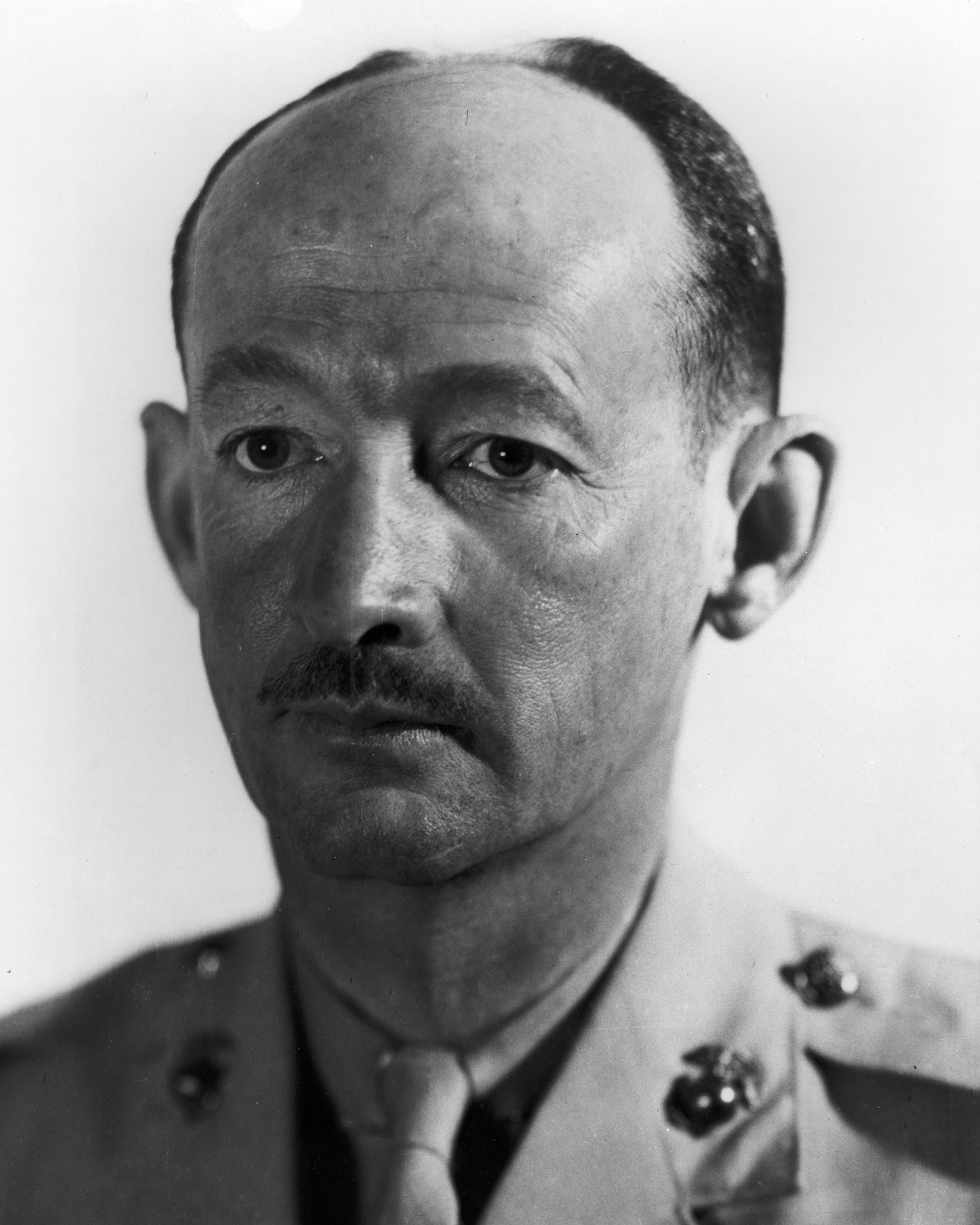
Nominee	J. Millard Tawes	James Devereux
Party	Democratic	Republican
Popular vote	485,061	278,173
Percentage	63.55%	36.45%
- County results Tawes: 50–60% 60–70% 70–80%
Governor before election
Theodore McKeldin
Republican
Elected Governor
J. Millard Tawes
Democratic

The 1958 Maryland gubernatorial election was held on November 4, 1958. Democratic nominee J. Millard Tawes defeated Republican nominee James Devereux with 63.55% of the vote.

== Primary elections ==
Primary elections were held on May 20, 1958.

=== Democratic primary ===
==== Candidates ====
- J. Millard Tawes, Comptroller of Maryland
- Bruce S. Campbell
- Morgan L. Amaimo
- Joseph A. Phillips

==== Results ====
Democratic primary results
Party	Candidate	Votes	%
Democratic	J. Millard Tawes	261,594	82.05
Democratic	Bruce S. Campbell	24,953	7.83
Democratic	Morgan L. Amaimo	16,459	5.16
Democratic	Joseph A. Phillips	15,836	4.97
Total votes		318,842	100.00

== General election ==
=== Candidates ===
- J. Millard Tawes, Democratic
- James Devereux, Republican

=== Results ===
1958 Maryland gubernatorial election
Party	Candidate	Votes	%	±%
Democratic	J. Millard Tawes	485,061	63.55%	
Republican	James Devereux	278,173	36.45%	
Majority		206,888		
Turnout		763,234		
Democratic gain from Republican		Swing		
