= Harry T. Phoebus =

American politician (1893-1964)

Member of the Maryland House of Delegates from Somerset County
- In office 1917–1921

Member of the Maryland Senate from Somerset County
- In office 1935–1937
- In office 1947–1964

Personal details
- Born: Harry Thomas Phoebus; February 24, 1893 Oriole, Maryland, U.S.
- Died: November 30, 1964 (aged 71) Salisbury, Maryland, U.S.
- Resting place: St. Peters Cemetery
- Party: Republican
- Spouse: Vera Beauchamp Pheobus
- Children: 4
- Occupation: politician

Harry Thomas Phoebus (February 24, 1893 – November 30, 1964) was a Maryland politician who served in the state legislature.

Phoebus sold cars and real estate until his election to the House in 1917. After leaving office for the first time in 1921, he served as a County Commissioner and County Treasurer for Somerset County. In 1930 he would run for the position of court clerk against Millard Tawes who would defeat him by 72 votes. He would be elected to serve in the Senate in 1935 and was made Commissioner of Labor and Statistics in 1937. Phoebus would be elected again to serve in the Senate in the 1940s and was made Minority Leader in 1955 serving in that capacity until he was replaced with Edward Hall when the Senate Leadership in both parties changed. Harry Phoebus died in Salisbury the next year at the age of 71, his son Harry Jr. was appointed to replace him.
