= J. Millard Tawes Historical Museum =

Museum in Maryland, United States

Coordinates: 37°58′45.5″N 75°51′38″W

- Location: Somers Cove Marina; Crisfield, Maryland; United States
- Type: Historical
- Website: J. Millard Tawes Historical Museum

The J. Tawes Historical Museum is located on the Somers Cove Marina, Crisfield, Maryland, United States. The museum focuses on the history of the Lower Shore region, including the local people, towns and industry. The museum also features a photograph exhibit about the 1938 Maryland crab pickers strike.

== See also ==
J. Millard Tawes (54th Governor of Maryland)
