= 1938 Maryland crab pickers strike =

Workers strike in 1938

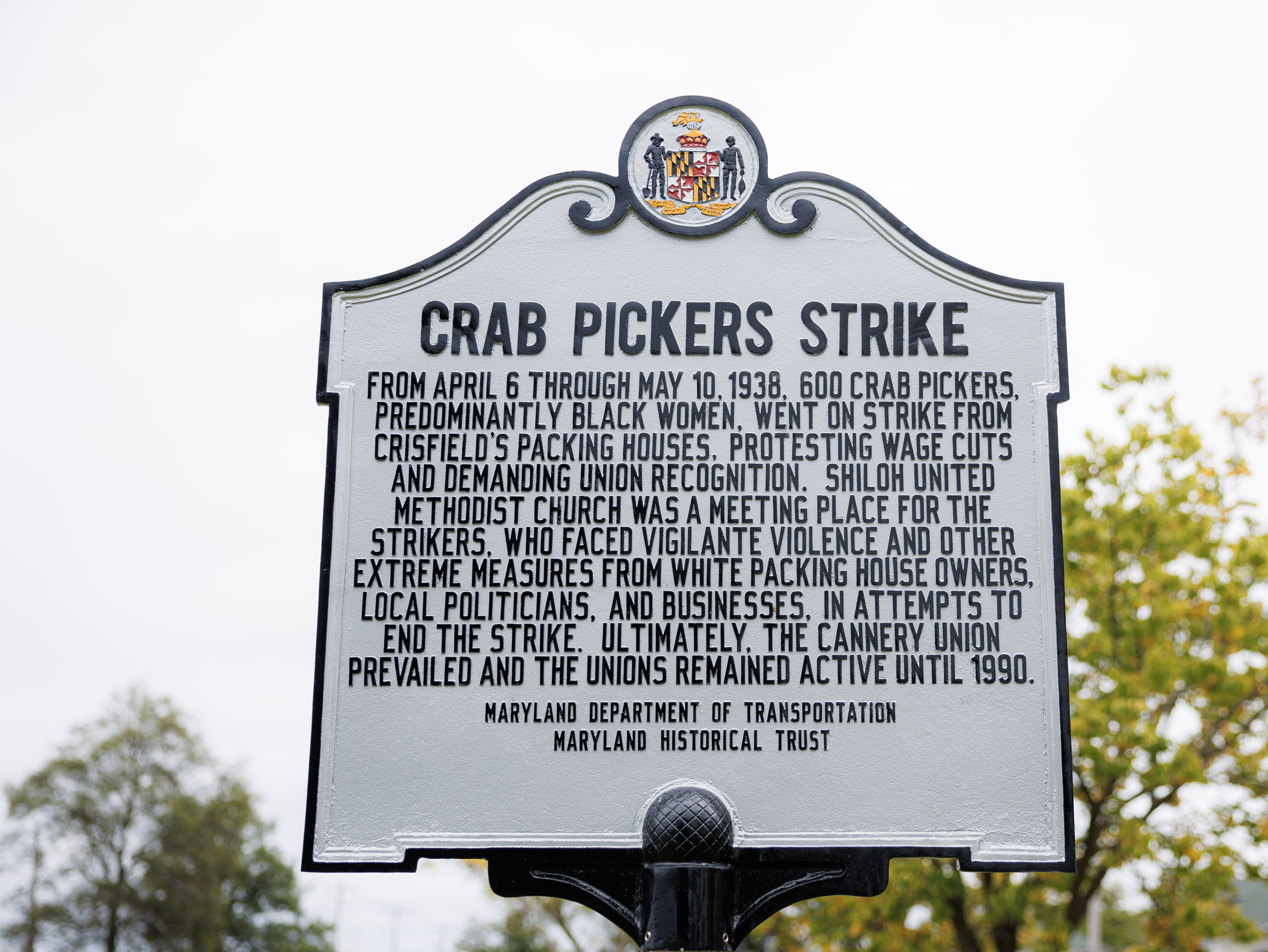
- State historical marker commemorating the strike
- Date: April 6, 1938 – May 10, 1938
- Location: Maryland, United States
- Caused by: Wage reduction
- Goals: No reduction in wages; Union recognition
- Result: Union Victory: Restoration of previous higher wage; Formal recognition of CIO Cannery Union

Parties
Congress of Industrial Organizations (CIO) Cannery Union; Cannery workers; Crab pickers	Crab packing companies

Number
600 Strikers	

The 1938 Maryland crab pickers strike was a significant labor action in Crisfield, Maryland, where approximately 600 predominantly African American women protested wage cuts and demanded union recognition. This five-week strike highlighted the critical role of Black women in the seafood industry and their fight for fair labor practices.

== Background ==
Crisfield, often referred to as the "Crab Capital of the World," was a hub for crab processing on the Eastern Shore in the early 20th century. The city's economy heavily relied on the labor of African American women who worked long hours picking crab meat for minimal wages. In 1938, Crisfield alone produced 13% of Maryland's hard crab catch, amounting to over 25,000 barrels, each weighing about 100 pounds.

On April 4, 1938, crab packing companies in Crisfield announced a wage reduction for crab pickers from 35 cents to 25 cents per gallon of crab meat. This decision came at a time when the community was already suffering from high unemployment due to the Great Depression and recent factory closures. The wage cut significantly impacted the livelihoods of the workers, prompting immediate action.

== The Strike ==
On April 6, 1938, approximately 600 crab pickers, predominantly African American women, initiated a strike against the wage reduction and sought recognition of their union, the Congress of Industrial Organizations (CIO) Cannery Union. The strike effectively halted crab processing at over 15 seafood plants in Crisfield, drawing attention to the workers' grievances.

During the strike, the workers faced significant opposition from white residents in the town, including vigilante violence. Homes of strike leaders were invaded, food deliveries to families were blocked, and a union organizer's car was overturned and burned in front of Shiloh United Methodist Church, which served as a meeting place for the strikers. Crisfield Sheriff William Dryden said he and his deputies were out of town during the car burning and did not make any arrests upon their return. A mob of approximately 150 to 200 white men also forced the federal mediator, Stanley White, out of the town. They briefly detained him and threw firecrackers at White before he agreed to leave the area. During this period, hotels refused accommodations to organizers, local stores cut off credit to the strikers, and vigilantes stopped vehicles driving into Crisfield and demanded that occupants state their business.

Governor of Maryland Harry Nice requested Major Elmer Munshower, commander of the Maryland State Police, to go to Crisfield and "report the true facts" of the situation to him. He later deployed state troops to stop the mob violence. He also asked his commissioner of labor, A. Stengle Marine, to attempt a negotiated settlement between the striking women and the crab packing companies.

On May 3, a group of the striking women met with Senator Robert La Follette, Labor department officials, and other federal representatives to discuss a solution to poor working conditions and the violence directed toward the strike organizers and leaders. The same day, the women filed charges that eleven Crisfield packing companies were violating the 1935 National Labor Relations Act.

== Resolution and impact ==
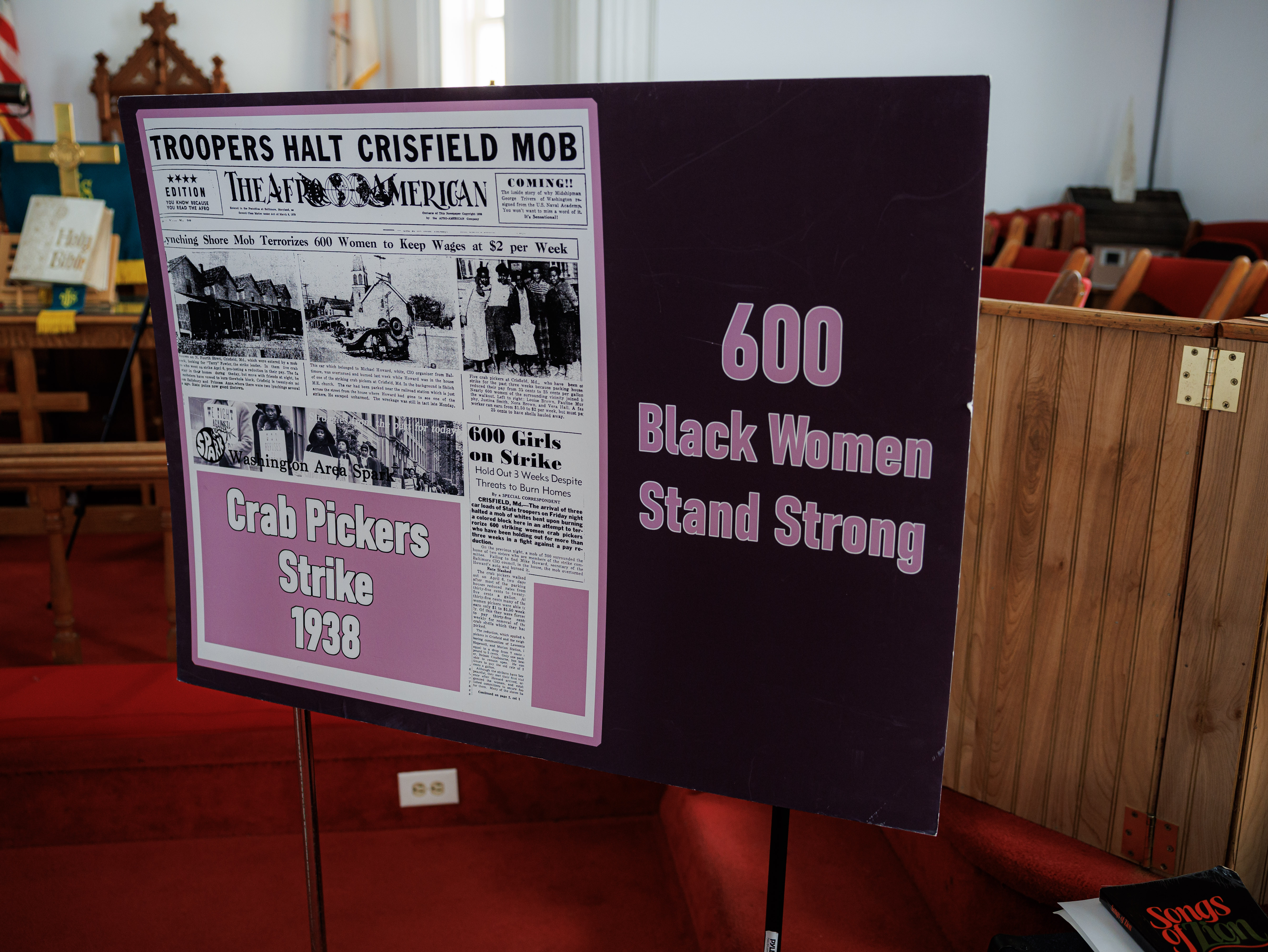
Photo display of news clippings from the strike, 2024

After five weeks of protest, the packing companies conceded on May 10, 1938, signing an agreement at the home of Commissioner Marine, restoring the wage to 35 cents per gallon and officially recognizing the CIO Cannery Union as the workers' bargaining agent.

This victory was a pivotal moment for labor rights, particularly for African American women in the seafood industry, and led to the growth of the National Cannery Union among African Americans in the East Coast and South. The agreement was also among the first large seafood worker contracts on the East Coast.

=== Legacy ===
The 1938 crab pickers strike underscored the essential contributions of African American women to the seafood industry and their determination to achieve fair labor practices. In recognition of this event, a Maryland state historical marker was unveiled on May 10, 2024, near Shiloh United Methodist Church in Crisfield, commemorating the courage and resilience of the strikers.

A photo exhibit of the strike is located at the J. Millard Tawes Historical Museum. The strike remains a significant example of collective action against labor injustices and highlights the critical role of African American women in labor history.
