= Strangers on a Treadmill =

- Modern Family episode
- Claire (Julie Bowen) trying to tell Cameron (Eric Stonestreet) about his bike shorts
- Episode no.: Season 2 Episode 4
- Directed by: Scott Ellis
- Written by: Danny Zuker
- Production code: 2ARG02
- Original air date: October 13, 2010

Episode chronology
← Previous "Earthquake"	Next → "Unplugged"
- Modern Family season 2

"Strangers on a Treadmill" is the fourth episode of the second season of the American sitcom, Modern Family and the 28th episode of the series overall. The episode originally aired on October 13, 2010 on American Broadcasting Company (ABC). The episode was written by Danny Zuker and directed by Scott Ellis.

In the episode, Claire and Mitchell try to spare their significant others from embarrassment, Haley tries to teach Alex how to be cool while Jay tries to prove to Gloria that he knows his employees' names.

"Strangers on a Treadmill" received mostly positive reviews with Joel Keller saying the secondary plots "didn't quite make it", but had "fun moments". According to the Nielsen Media Research it received a 4.8 rating/13% share in the 18–49 demographic increasing 4% from the previous episode. The episode also became the first of the series to become the highest-rated scripted program of the week in the 18–49 demographic.

== Plot ==
The episode begins with Phil (Ty Burrell) writing jokes for the SCARB (Southern California Annual Realtors Banquet) that he is hosting. Contrary to his belief, Claire (Julie Bowen) expects him to bomb with his unfunny jokes.

Cameron (Eric Stonestreet) decides to work out with bike shorts much to Mitchell's (Jesse Tyler Ferguson) chagrin. While working out, Claire and Mitchell decide to tell the others' spouse of their bad habit (like Strangers on a Train). At the Dunphys' house, Mitchell arrives to tell Phil about his bad jokes. Unfortunately, Mitchell can not go through with it after seeing Phil's sad face. Meanwhile, Claire tells Cameron about how bad he looks in bike shorts causing Cameron to go and cry in the hallway.

Later that day Claire calls Mitchell asking him why he did not go through with their deal. While they are talking, Cameron hears the conversation and becomes sad once again. To prove their relationship can stand anything, Mitchell gets ready to shave off his beard, but after only cutting a single part of it, Cameron tells him he loves his beard. The couple kiss and make up, but they soon get into another disagreement.

At the SCARB, Claire hides Phil's lines in her purse. Phil decides to go to the podium and improvise, and his jokes prove to be a huge hit with the crowd to Claire's amazement. At their house Phil tells her he knows she took the cards and thanks her for looking out for him.

Meanwhile, at Jay's house, Gloria (Sofía Vergara) reminds Jay (Ed O'Neill) about his co-worker's quinceañera. Initially Jay decides not to go, but to prove a point to Gloria, Jay changes his mind. When they arrive Jay convinces Manny (Rico Rodriguez) to ask everybody's name so he can win the fight he had with Gloria. Gloria soon realizes they are at an engagement party which is next door to the quinceañera and tries to tell Jay, but he will not listen. He gives a speech and offers to pay the bar tab, however when the engaged couple kiss each other Jay tries to stop it, as he thinks it's a father and daughter dancing.

At the Dunphy house, hearing Alex (Ariel Winter) nervously calling a girl named McKenzie, Haley (Sarah Hyland) decides to help her become more popular by teaching her the basics of adolescent social maneuvering. Her help works when Alex begins to take control of the relationship with McKenzie, saying she will "try to come" to the other girl's party. It then turns into chaos when Alex mentions she has to do homework, panics and says she loves homework. That makes her more nervous and says "I love you" to McKenzie.

== Production and cultural references ==
"Strangers on a Treadmill" was written by Danny Zuker, marking his fourth writing credit for the series. The episode was directed by Scott Ellis, his second directing credit for the series having directed the episode "The Kiss". It originally aired on October 13, 2010.

Before airing, the episode was read at a live table read on August 3, 2010, and more details of the plot were revealed at the 62nd Primetime Emmy Awards by Eric Stonestreet.

Mitchell and Claire's plan and the title are based on the movie, Strangers on a Train. Phil's line "I know it was you Claire" serves as a homage to The Godfather Part II.

== Reception ==
=== Ratings ===
In its original American broadcast on October 13, 2010, "Strangers on a Treadmill" was viewed by 11.344 million households and received a 4.8 rating/13% share among viewers between the ages of 18 and 49. This means that it was seen by 4.8% of all 18- to 49-year-olds, and 13% of all 18- to 49-year-olds watching television at the time of the broadcast. This marked an improvement from the previous episode, "Earthquake". "Strangers on a Treadmill" was the most-watched scripted show for the week of broadcast among adults aged 18–49, marking a first for the series. The episode also became the eighteenth most-watched show among all viewers.

=== Reviews ===
The episode received positive reviews from critics.

Joel Keller of TV Squad gave the episode a mostly positive review. He felt while the two main stories "clicked" he also felt "the two secondary stories didn't quite make it" although he stated they had "fun moments". He also complimented the writers for giving Alex and Haley more screen time.

Donna Bowman of The A.V. Club rated the episode with a B+ commenting that Luke (Nolan Gould) was the best supporting character. He also called Phil's success during his speech "one of the best moments this show has produced".

James Poniewozik of Time stated in his review "not a remarkable episode, but one with several nice moments.

Lesley Savage of Entertainment Weekly gave the episode a positive review. She stated in her review "by the time the frame-within-a-frame-within-a-frame title sequence kicked in after just four minutes of couch-potato time, all my tension and irritation had been washed away by a flood of laughter."

Alan Speinwall stated "an episode like "Strangers on a Treadmill" - while having a number of strong individual moments - was a reminder that sometimes the show can get too crowded for its own good."

Matt Roush of TV Guide wrote that "No show had me laughing out loud more this week (as usual) than the brilliantly structured Modern Family".

=== Awards ===
This episode won Julie Bowen the Primetime Emmy Award for Outstanding Supporting Actress in a Comedy Series.
