= 1962 Maryland gubernatorial election =

- November 6, 1962
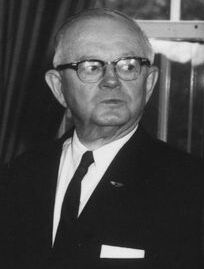

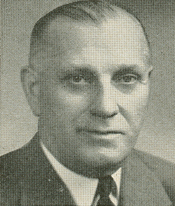
Nominee	J. Millard Tawes	Frank Small Jr.
Party	Democratic	Republican
Popular vote	428,071	341,271
Percentage	55.64%	44.36%
- County results Tawes: 50–60% 60–70% Small: 50–60%
Governor before election
J. Millard Tawes
Democratic
Elected Governor
J. Millard Tawes
Democratic

The 1962 Maryland gubernatorial election was held on November 6, 1962. Incumbent Democrat J. Millard Tawes defeated Republican nominee Frank Small Jr. with 55.64% of the vote.

== Primary elections ==
Primary elections were held on May 15, 1962.

=== Democratic primary ===
==== Candidates ====
- Morgan L. Amaimo
- William George Bennett Crain
- David Hume
- Charles J. Luthardt Sr.
- George P. Mahoney, perennial candidate
- Lester Posner
- J. Millard Tawes, incumbent governor

==== Results ====
Democratic primary results
Party	Candidate	Votes	%
Democratic	J. Millard Tawes (incumbent)	178,792	40.39
Democratic	George P. Mahoney	125,966	28.46
Democratic	David Hume	118,295	26.72
Democratic	Morgan L. Amaimo	6,049	1.37
Democratic	Lester Posner	5,070	1.15
Democratic	Charles J. Luthardt Sr.	4,358	0.98
Democratic	William George Bennett Crain	4,135	0.93
Total votes		442,665	100.00

=== Republican primary ===
==== Candidates ====
- Karla M. E. Balentine
- Jeseph L. Pavlock
- Frank Small Jr., former U.S. representative

==== Results ====
Republican primary results
Party	Candidate	Votes	%
Republican	Frank Small Jr.	71,791	77.81
Republican	Karla M. E. Balentine	11,504	12.47
Republican	Jeseph L. Pavlock	8,972	9.72
Total votes		92,267	100.00

== General election ==
=== Candidates ===
- Frank Small Jr., Republican
- J. Millard Tawes, Democratic

=== Results ===
1962 Maryland gubernatorial election
Party	Candidate	Votes	%	±%
Democratic	J. Millard Tawes (incumbent)	428,071	55.64%	
Republican	Frank Small Jr.	341,271	44.36%	
Majority		86,800		
Turnout		769,347		
Democratic hold		Swing		
