= Annie Luetkemeyer =

American physician and infectious diseases researcher

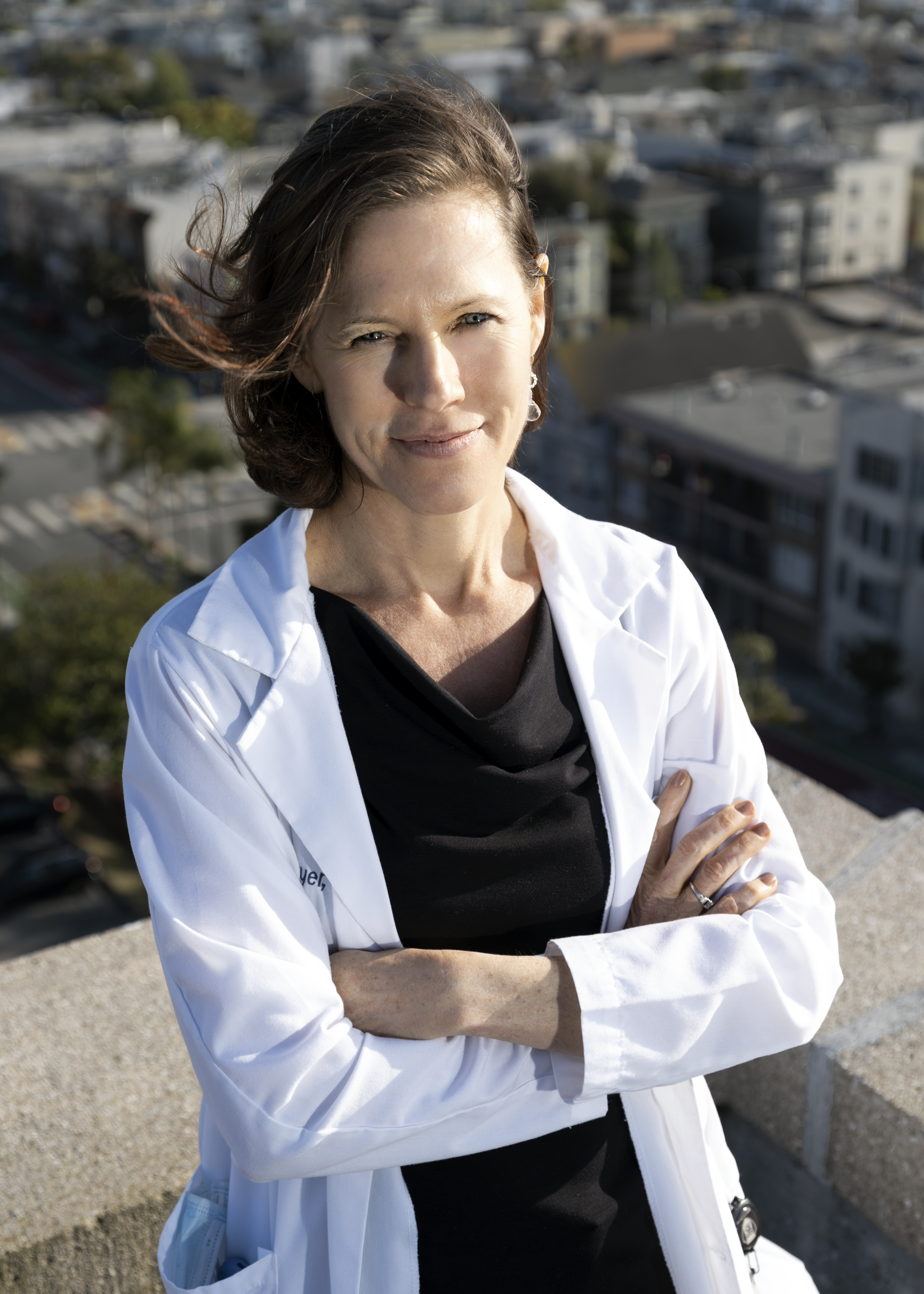
- Luetkemeyer in 2021
- Born: Annie F. Luetkemeyer; April 13, 1972 (age 54); Baltimore, Maryland U.S.
- Education: Stanford University; Harvard Medical School
- Occupation: Infectious diseases researcher
- Years active: 1999–present
- Relatives: Julie Bowen (sister); John Luetkemeyer (paternal grandfather)

Annie F. Luetkemeyer (born April 13, 1972, Baltimore, Maryland, U.S.) is an American physician and researcher who is Professor of Medicine and Infectious Diseases at the University of California, San Francisco. She specializes in infectious diseases, in particular tuberculosis, human immunodeficiency virus and viral hepatitis. During the COVID-19 pandemic Luetkemeyer led a clinical trial of remdesivir. She has also researched treatment of COVID-19 as a co-infection with HIV.

== Early life and education ==
Luetkemeyer was born on April 13, 1972, in Baltimore, Maryland, to Suzanne Luetkemeyer (née Frey) and John Alexander Luetkemeyer Jr., a commercial real estate developer. She is the youngest of three sisters, one of whom is actress Julie Bowen. She grew up in Ruxton-Riderwood, Maryland. In 1984, Luetkemeyer graduated from the Calvert School.

In 1994, Luetkemeyer received an AB with distinction in American Studies from Stanford University. In 1999, she received a Doctor of Medicine from Harvard Medical School. In 2002 and 2003, Luetkemeyer trained in internal medicine at the University of California, San Francisco. In 2006, she completed advance training in clinical research there, and then an infectious disease fellowship in 2007.

== Career ==
In 2012 Luetkemeyer called for investigations into the doses of medications used for the treatment of HIV infection and tuberculosis. The Food and Drug Administration had rewritten the recommendations in 2012. In a series of small studies in Europe it had been shown that rifampicin, a drug used to treat tuberculosis, could limit the effectiveness of efavirenz, a drug used to treat HIV. The drugs interact through a liver enzyme (cytochrome P450) that is produced at elevated levels in patients who take rifampicin, and breaks down the efavirenz. To overcome this, the 2012 FDA recommendations proposed larger doses of efavirenz. Luetkemeyer argued that the recommendations were not appropriate for all populations in the United States, and could result in more drug toxicity. She showed that increasing the dosage of efavirenz may cause more side effects—as well as coming at a greater financial cost.

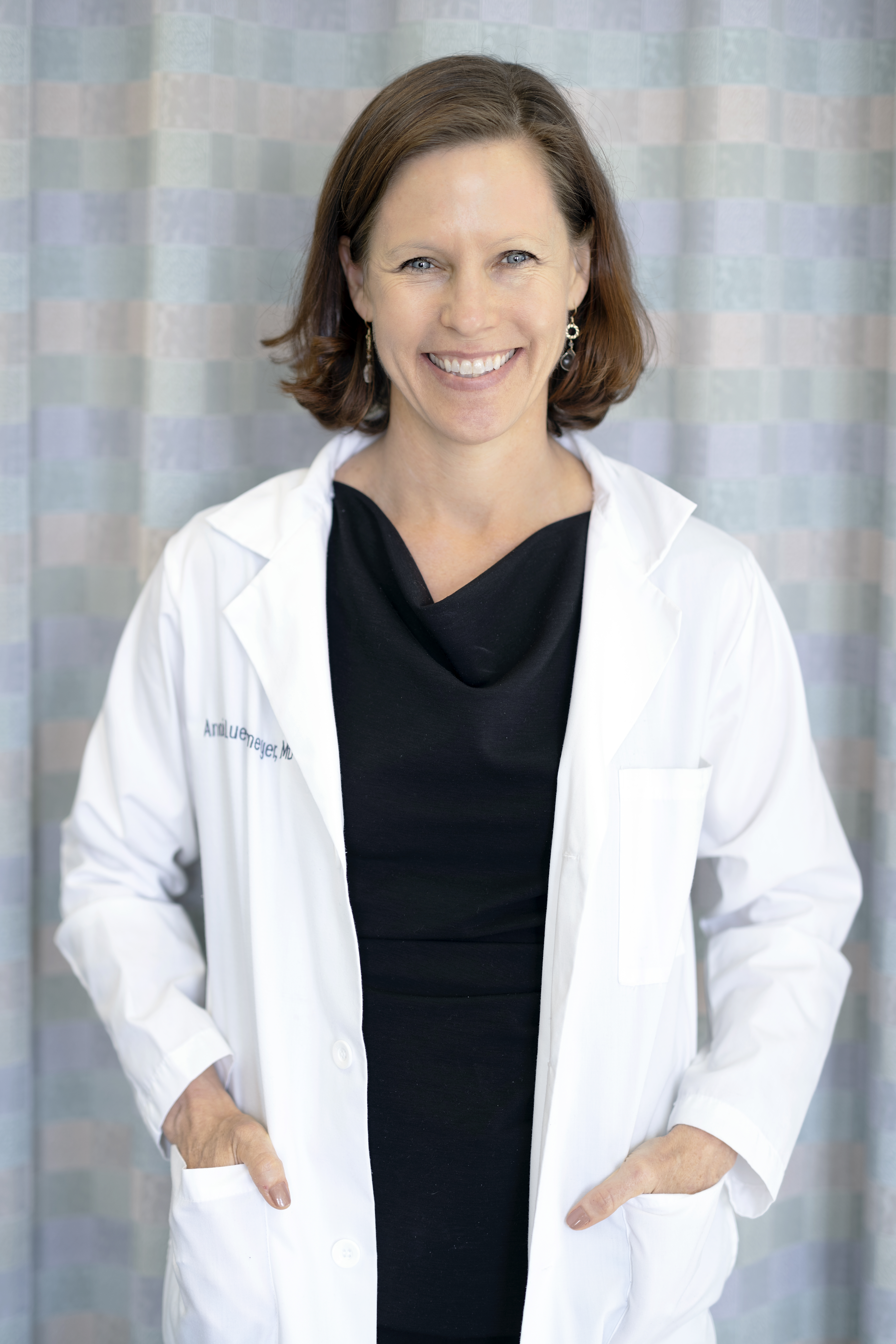
Dr Annie Luetkemeyer in 2021

During the COVID-19 pandemic, Luetkemeyer led investigations into potential therapies for the disease. She is a member of the UCSF cross-campus COVID-19 task force. In line with most official advice, Luetkemeyer called for older people and those with preexisting conditions to be more careful during the outbreak, as the virus "taxes all organ systems". She studied which COVID-19 patients were most likely to benefit from treatment, when during the illness was the best time for treatment, and which types of treatment (antivirals or anti-inflammatories) were most appropriate. She has also outlined what pre- and post-exposure prophylaxis healthcare workers and household contacts can do to prevent disease spread. Luetkemeyer has called for more randomized controlled trials to assess the impact of hydroxychloroquine. She led a clinical trial of the drug remdesivir with other researchers like Sarah Pett. The San Francisco General Hospital SARS-CoV-2 guidelines recommend treatment only if patients are hospitalized or have strong risk factors for progression into severe disease.

== Selected works and publications ==
- Luetkemeyer, Annie; Hare, C. Bradley; Stansell, John; Tien, Phyllis C.; Charlesbois, Edwin; Lum, Paula; Havlir, Diane; Peters, Marion (January 1, 2006). "Clinical Presentation and Course of Acute Hepatitis C Infection in HIV-Infected Patients". Journal of Acquired Immune Deficiency Syndromes. 41 (1): 31–36. doi:10.1097/01.qai.0000191281.77954.27. ISSN 1525-4135. PMC 4050666. PMID 16340470. Wikidata ()
- Luetkemeyer, Annie F.; Charlebois, Edwin D.; Flores, Laura L.; Bangsberg, David R.; Deeks, Steven G.; Martin, Jeffrey N.; Havlir, Diane V. (January 11, 2007). "Comparison of an Interferon-γ Release Assay with Tuberculin Skin Testing in HIV-infected Individuals". American Journal of Respiratory and Critical Care Medicine. 175 (7): 737–742. doi:10.1164/rccm.200608-1088OC. ISSN 1073-449X. PMC 1899289. PMID 17218620. Wikidata ()
- Havlir, Diane V.; Kendall, Michelle A.; Ive, Prudence; Kumwenda, Johnstone; Swindells, Susan; Qasba, Sarojini S.; Luetkemeyer, Anne F.; Hogg, Evelyn; Rooney, James F.; Wu, Xingye; Hosseinipour, Mina C.; Lalloo, Umesh; Veloso, Valdilea G.; Some, Fatuma F.; Kumarasamy, N.; Padayatchi, Nesri; Santos, Breno R.; Reid, Stewart; Hakim, James; Mohapi, Lerato; Mugyenyi, Peter; Sanchez, Jorge; Lama, Javier R.; Pape, Jean W.; Sanchez, Alejandro; Asmelash, Aida; Moko, Evans; Sawe, Fred; Andersen, Janet; Sanne, Ian (October 20, 2011). "Timing of Antiretroviral Therapy for HIV-1 Infection and Tuberculosis". New England Journal of Medicine. 365 (16): 1482–1491. doi:10.1056/NEJMoa1013607. PMC 3327101. PMID 22010914. Wikidata ()
- Sandler, Netanya G.; Zhang, Xinyan; Bosch, Ronald J.; Funderburg, Nicholas T.; Choi, Andrew I.; Robinson, Janet K.; Fine, Derek M.; Coombs, Robert W.; Jacobson, Jeffrey M.; Landay, Alan L.; Douek, Daniel C. (November 15, 2014). "Sevelamer Does Not Decrease Lipopolysaccharide or Soluble CD14 Levels But Decreases Soluble Tissue Factor, Low-Density Lipoprotein (LDL) Cholesterol, and Oxidized LDL Cholesterol Levels in Individuals With Untreated HIV Infection". Journal of Infectious Diseases. 210 (10): 1549–1554. doi:10.1093/infdis/jiu305. ISSN 0022-1899. PMC 4215074. PMID 24864123. Wikidata ()
- Naggie, Susanna; Cooper, Curtis; Saag, Michael; Workowski, Kimberly; Ruane, Peter; Towner, William J.; Marks, Kristen; Luetkemeyer, Anne; Baden, Rachel P.; Sax, Paul E.; Gane, Edward; Santana-Bagur, Jorge; Stamm, Luisa M.; Yang, Jenny C.; German, Polina; Dvory-Sobol, Hadas; Ni, Liyun; Pang, Phillip S.; McHutchison, John G.; Stedman, Catherine A.M.; Morales-Ramirez, Javier O.; Bräu, Norbert; Jayaweera, Dushyantha; Colson, Amy E.; Tebas, Pablo; Wong, David K.; Dieterich, Douglas; Sulkowski, Mark (August 20, 2015). "Ledipasvir and Sofosbuvir for HCV in Patients Coinfected with HIV-1". New England Journal of Medicine. 373 (8): 705–713. doi:10.1056/NEJMoa1501315. PMC 4892372. PMID 26196665. Wikidata ()
- Luetkemeyer, Annie (August 2, 2016). "Hepatitis C is Curable". KQED.
- Naggie, Susanna; Fierer, Daniel S; Hughes, Michael D; Kim, Arthur Y; Luetkemeyer, Annie; Vu, Vincent; Roa, Jhoanna; Rwema, Steve; Brainard, Diana M; McHutchison, John G; Peters, Marion G; Kiser, Jennifer J; Marks, Kristen M; Chung, Raymond T; Alston-Smith, Beverly; Weichmann, Laura; Sise, Thucuma; Cosimano, Emily; Jennings, Cheryl; Moyo, Sikhulile; Dadson, Oswald; Luetkemeyer, Annie; Dwyer, Jay; Hughes, Valery; Grenade, Joanne; Stroberg, Todd; Ilmet, Tiina; Henn, Sarah; Kiger, Kristi; Flynn, Teri; Sbrolla, Amy; Nuffer, Kathleen; Wyles, David; McGregor, Donna; Hawkins, Claudia; Williams, Brett; Green, Tondria; Tebas, Pablo; Kim, Deborah; Bedimo, Roger; Wise, Holly; Arduino, Roberto C; Villamil, Aristoteles (August 1, 2019). "Ledipasvir/Sofosbuvir for 8 Weeks to Treat Acute Hepatitis C Virus Infections in Men With Human Immunodeficiency Virus Infections: Sofosbuvir-Containing Regimens Without Interferon for Treatment of Acute HCV in HIV-1 Infected Individuals". Clinical Infectious Diseases. 69 (3): 514–522. doi:10.1093/cid/ciy913. PMC 6637278. PMID 31220220.
- Grant, Juliana S; Stafylis, Chrysovalantis; Celum, Connie; Grennan, Troy; Haire, Bridget; Kaldor, John; Luetkemeyer, Anne F; Saunders, John M; Molina, Jean-Michel; Klausner, Jeffrey D (September 1, 2019). "Doxycycline Prophylaxis for Bacterial Sexually Transmitted Infections". Clinical Infectious Diseases. 70 (6): 1247–1253. doi:10.1093/cid/ciz866. PMC 7319058. PMID 31504345.
- Garcia-Cremades, Maria; Solans, Belen P.; Hughes, Emma; Ernest, Jacqueline P.; Wallender, Erika; Aweeka, Francesca; Luetkemeyer, Annie; Savic, Radojka M (April 14, 2020). "Optimizing hydroxychloroquine dosing for patients with COVID-19: An integrative modeling approach for effective drug repurposing". Clinical Pharmacology & Therapeutics. 108 (2): 253–263. doi:10.1002/cpt.1856. PMC 7262072. PMID 32285930.
