= Frank Small Jr. =

American politician (1896-1973)

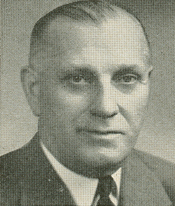

Member of the U.S. House of Representatives from Maryland's 5th district
- In office January 3, 1953 – January 3, 1955
- Preceded by: Lansdale Sasscer
- Succeeded by: Richard Lankford

Member of the Maryland House of Delegates
- In office 1927-1928

Personal details
- Born: July 15, 1896 Temple Hills, Maryland, U.S.
- Died: October 24, 1973 (aged 77) Washington, D.C., U.S.
- Party: Republican

Frank Small Jr. (July 15, 1896 – October 24, 1973) represented the fifth district of the state of Maryland in the United States House of Representatives for one term from 1953 to 1955.

Small was born on a farm in Temple Hills, Maryland, attended the public schools, and received technical education at the National Automobile College in 1914 and 1915. He operated several farms, and engaged in banking and the automobile business from 1923 to 1957. He served in the Maryland House of Delegates in 1927 and 1928, and was a member of the board of county commissioners from 1930 to 1934.

From 1934 to 1942, Small was a member of the Republican State Central committee, serving as chairman for some of this time. He was a member of the Maryland Racing Commission from 1937 to 1952, serving as chairman in 1951 and 1952. He was president of Clinton Bank of Clinton, Maryland from 1928 to 1972, and delegate to the Republican National Conventions of 1940, 1944, and 1956.

Small was elected as a Republican to Congress in 1952, serving from January 3, 1953, to January 3, 1955, but was an unsuccessful for reelection in 1954. He engaged in real estate from 1954 to 1973, served as Maryland Commissioner of Motor Vehicles from April 29, 1955, to April 15, 1957, Republican nominee for Governor of Maryland in 1962 (Maryland Manual 1963–64) and as vice president of the Equitable Trust Co. of Baltimore, Maryland. Small died in Washington, D.C., and is interred in Resurrection Cemetery of Clinton.

U.S. House of Representatives
Preceded by Lansdale Sasscer	United States Representative from Maryland's 5th congressional district 1953–1955	Succeeded by Richard Lankford
Party political offices
Preceded by James Devereux	Republican nominee for Governor of Maryland; 1962	Succeeded by Spiro Agnew
