= Sarah Pett =

British immunopathologist and COVID-19 researcher

- Education: University of Edinburgh
- Scientific career
- Fields: Immunopathology
- Workplaces: University of New South Wales; University College London

Sarah L. Pett is a Professor of Infectious Diseases at University College London. Pett is interested in the immunopathology of infections and the development of optimised treatment pathways for infections. During the COVID-19 pandemic, Pett led a clinical trial that investigated the efficacy of remdesivir as a treatment for coronavirus disease.

== Research and career ==
In 2000 Pett joined the Kirby Institute in New South Wales, where she led international randomized controlled trials. In 2013 Pett joined the Medical Research Council Clinical Trials Unit at University College London. She was promoted to the Chair of the Infectious Diseases theme in 2016.

During the COVID-19 pandemic Pett led the Adaptive COVID-19 Treatment Trial (ACTT-EU/UK), a clinical trial into the efficacy of remdesivir as a treatment from coronavirus disease. Adult inpatients were given remdesivir or a placebo through a drip for up to ten days of their stay in hospital. Pett showed that patients treated with remdesivir recovered 31% faster than those who did not receive treatment.

She has also been involved in research on the neurological complications from COVID-19 and the co-morbid conditions that it may induce.

== Selected publications ==
- Neuhaus, Jacqueline Jacobs, David R. Baker, Jason V. Calmy, Alexandra Duprez, Daniel La Rosa, Alberto Kuller, Lewis H. Pett, Sarah L. Ristola, Matti Ross, Michael J. Shlipak, Michael G. Tracy, Russell Neaton, James D. (2010). "Markers of Inflammation, Coagulation, and Renal Function Are Elevated in Adults with HIV Infection". The Journal of Infectious Diseases. 201 (12): 1788–1795. doi:10.1086/652749. OCLC 999829131. PMC 2872049. PMID 20446848.
- Babiker, Abdel G Emery, Sean Fätkenheuer, Gerd Gordin, Fred M Grund, Birgit Lundgren, Jens D Neaton, James D Pett, Sarah L Phillips, Andrew Touloumi, Giota Vjechaj, Michael J (2013). "Considerations in the rationale, design and methods of the Strategic Timing of AntiRetroviral Treatment (START) study". Clinical Trials (London, England). 10 (1 Suppl): S5–S36. doi:10.1177/1740774512440342. OCLC 870252553. PMC 3664112. PMID 22547421.
- Seddiki, Nabila; Sasson, Sarah C.; Santner-Nanan, Brigitte; Munier, Meeling; Bockel, David van; Ip, Susanna; Marriott, Debbie; Pett, Sarah; Nanan, Ralph; Cooper, David A.; Zaunders, John J. (2009). "Proliferation of weakly suppressive regulatory CD4+ T cells is associated with over-active CD4+ T-cell responses in HIV-positive patients with mycobacterial immune restoration disease". European Journal of Immunology. 39 (2): 391–403. doi:10.1002/eji.200838630. ISSN 1521-4141. PMID 19180462. S2CID 24793084.
