= John Luetkemeyer =

American politician (1910–1998)

Treasurer of Maryland
- In office 1963–1973
- Governor: J. Millard Tawes; Spiro T. Agnew; Marvin Mandel
- Preceded by: Hooper Miles
- Succeeded by: J. Millard Tawes

Personal details
- Born: John Alexander Luetkemeyer; February 12, 1910 Cleveland, Ohio
- Died: September 17, 1998 (aged 88) Roland Park, Baltimore, Maryland
- Party: Democratic Party
- Children: John Luetkemeyer Jr., Anne Luetkemeyer Stone, Jean Scott Prema
- Relatives: Julie Bowen (granddaughter); Annie Luetkemeyer (granddaughter)
- Education: Harvard

John Alexander Luetkemeyer, Sr. (February 12, 1910 – September 17, 1998) was Treasurer of Maryland.

Luetkemeyer was born in Cleveland Ohio, the son of Gustave Luetkemeyer and Julie (née Lueke). His four grandparents were born in Germany.

In 1942, he was in the Marines as a bomb disposal expert, receiving the Purple Heart twice and the Bronze Star for gallantry.

In 1961, Luetkemeyer was appointed to the banking board by J. Millard Tawes while serving as president of the Equitable Bank and Trust Company. The position determined which banks received deposits from the state and would be considered a conflict of interest under current regulations.

He was the grandfather of actress Julie Bowen (born Julie Luetkemeyer) and physician Annie Luetkemeyer.
