= Julie Bowen =

American actress (born 1970)

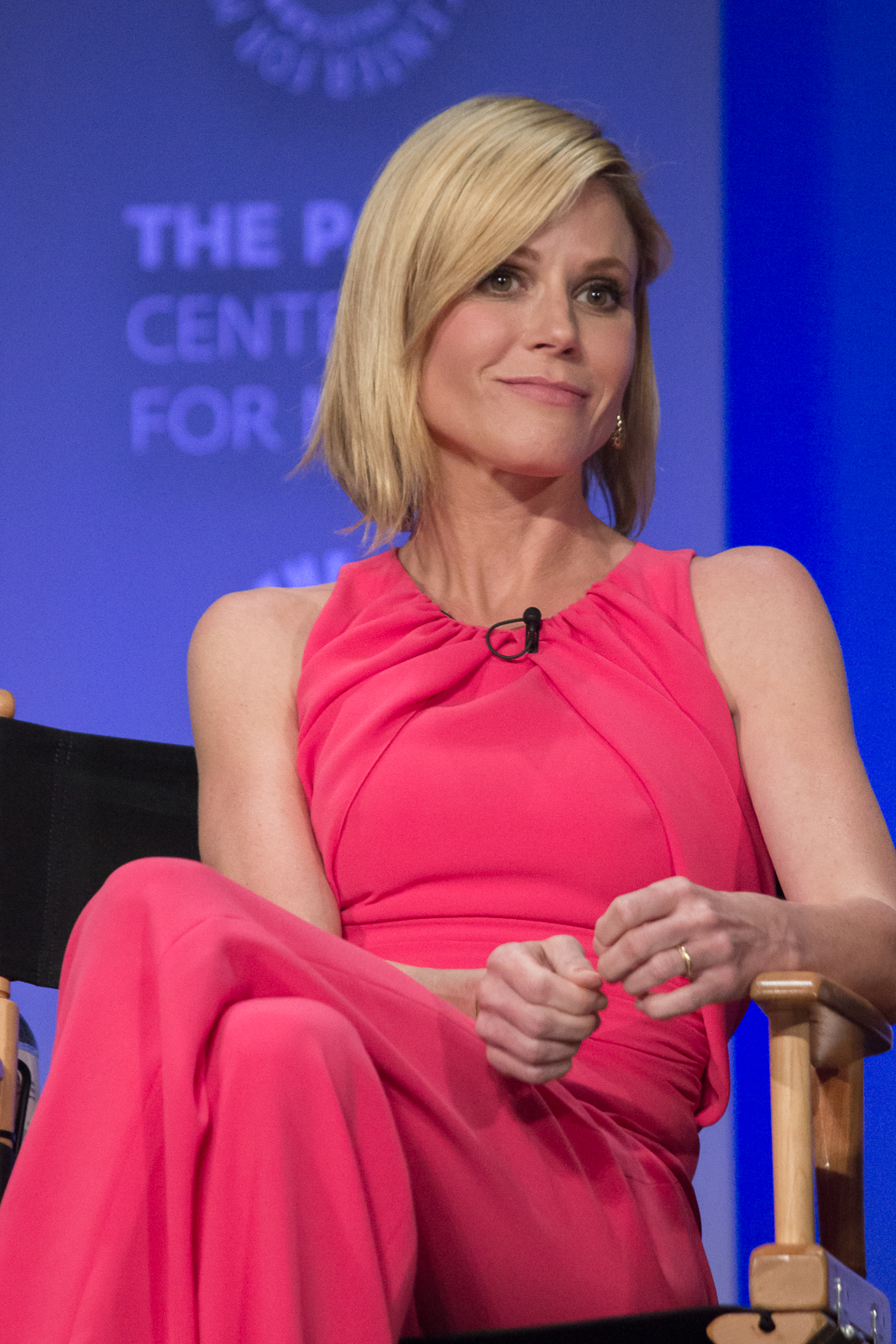
- Bowen in 2015
- Born: Julie Bowen Luetkemeyer; March 3, 1970 (age 56); Baltimore, Maryland, U.S.
- Education: Brown University (BA)
- Occupation: Actress
- Years active: 1992–present
- Spouse: Scott Phillips (m. 2004; div. 2018)
- Children: 3
- Relatives: Annie Luetkemeyer (sister); Molly Luetkemeyer (sister); John Luetkemeyer (paternal grandfather)

Julie Bowen (born Julie Bowen Luetkemeyer; March 3, 1970) is an American actress. She is best known as Claire Dunphy in ABC sitcom Modern Family (2009–2020), for which she received widespread critical acclaim, winning two Primetime Emmy Awards.

Bowen also starred as Roxanne Please in NBC medical drama series ER (1998–1999), Carol Vessey in the NBC comedy-drama series Ed (2000–2004), and Denise Bauer in the ABC legal drama series Boston Legal (2005–2007), and recurred as Sarah Shephard in the ABC drama series Lost (2005–2007).

Bowen has appeared in many films, such as Happy Gilmore (1996), Multiplicity (1996), Joe Somebody (2001), Horrible Bosses (2011), Life of the Party (2018), Hubie Halloween (2020), The Fallout (2021), Totally Killer (2023), and Happy Gilmore 2 (2025).

== Early life ==
Bowen was born on March 3, 1970 in Baltimore, Maryland, the second of three daughters of Suzanne Luetkemeyer (née Frey) and John Alexander Luetkemeyer Jr., a commercial real estate developer and son of John Luetkemeyer and Anne McLanahan. She is the sister of infectious disease specialist Annie Luetkemeyer and designer Molly Luetkemeyer. Bowen is of German descent.

Raised in suburban Ruxton-Riderwood, Maryland, Bowen first attended Calvert School, then Garrison Forest School, Roland Park Country School, and St. George's School in Middletown, Rhode Island. She attended Brown University, majoring in Italian Renaissance studies. She spent her junior year in Florence, Italy. During college, she had roles in Guys and Dolls, Stage Door, and Lemon Sky. Before graduating, she had the lead role in the independent film Five Spot Jewel. Bowen studied acting at the Actor's Institute, among other places.

== Career ==
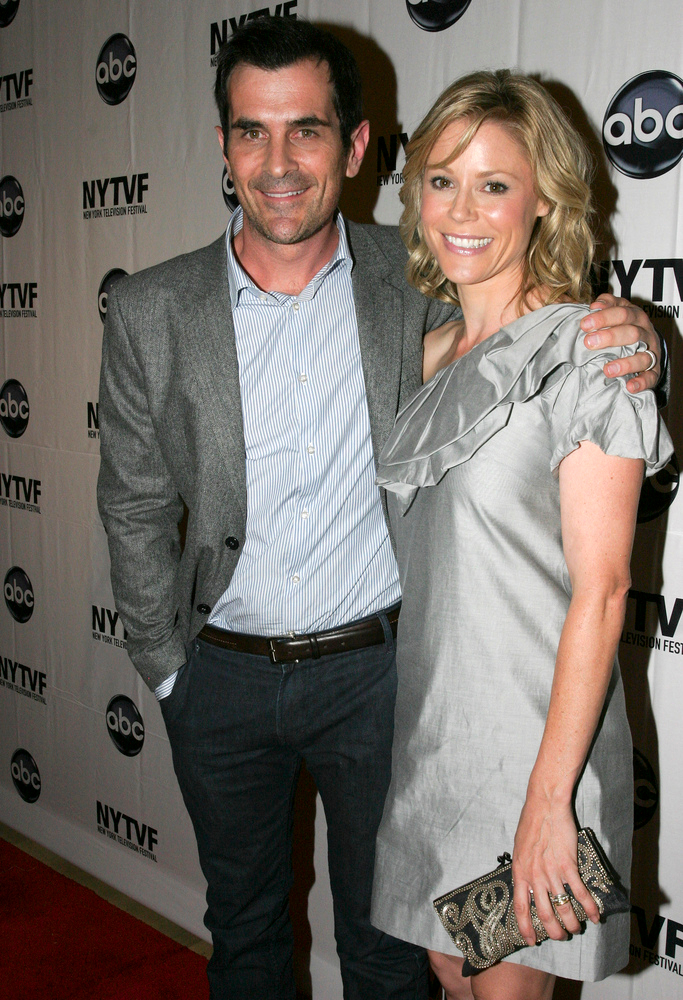
Bowen with Modern Family co-star Ty Burrell in 2009

Bowen had a role in the soap opera Loving (1992) and an episode of the college drama Class of '96 (1993). She had the lead role in the television film Runaway Daughters (1994). She played the love interest of the title character in Happy Gilmore (1996). She appeared in the films Multiplicity (1996) and An American Werewolf in Paris (1997). She has had guest roles on television series such as Party of Five (1996) and Strange Luck (1996), as well as her role as Aunt Gwen in the drama series Dawson's Creek (1999).

Bowen had a recurring role as Roxanne Please on ER (1998–99). She first gained prominence on the television series Ed (2000–04), where she played high school English teacher Carol Vessey. She then guest starred as Sarah Shephard in five episodes of Lost (2005–07). She also played attorney Denise Bauer on the series Boston Legal (2005–08), and had a recurring role on Weeds (2008). She was a spokesmodel for Neutrogena, most recently advertising the Pure Glow products. She appeared on an episode of Celebrity Jeopardy! on August 31, 2010, and again on December 4, 2022.

From 2009 to 2020, Bowen starred as Claire Dunphy on the ABC sitcom Modern Family. For her portrayal, she received six consecutive Primetime Emmy Award nominations for Outstanding Supporting Actress in a Comedy Series (2010–15), winning the award in 2011 and 2012. Bowen has said that winning an Emmy is like "German soldiers in the trenches of the World Wars" and that "when you win the award, it is like being pulled out of the trench." She also said, "As exciting and wonderful as it is not to be in the trench, and to be recognized for what you do, it also means everyone has got a clear shot at you and that is a very frightening prospect for most of us."

In November 2021, Bowen's production company, Bowen & Sons, entered a first-look deal at Universal Television.

In March 2023, Prom Pact, a movie produced by Bowen, was released on the Disney Channel and Disney+ in the United States.

== Personal life ==
Bowen married Scott Phillips, a real estate investor and software developer, on September 9, 2004. They have three sons, the first born in April 2007, and twins born in May 2009, with whom she was visibly pregnant when shooting the pilot for Modern Family. In February 2018, she filed for divorce from Phillips and cited irreconcilable differences as the reason for the divorce. It was finalized on September 14, 2018.

She is a self-described "low Protestant".

=== Health ===
Bowen has the heart condition bradycardia meaning her regular heart rate is slower than normal. As a result, she has had a pacemaker implant since her late twenties.

Bowen has also publicly discussed her experience with chronic dry eye, a progressive condition she has managed for approximately two decades. She has also served as a spokeswoman for the prescription eye drop Xiidra, to help manage her symptoms.

=== Political views ===
In 2016, Bowen appeared in "Fight Song", a Pitch Perfect–inspired music video shown at the Democratic National Convention in support of nominee Hillary Clinton.

== Filmography ==
=== Film ===
Year	Title	Role	Notes
1996	Confessions of a Sleep Addict	P.J.	
1996	Happy Gilmore	Virginia Venit	
1996	Multiplicity	Robin	
1997	An American Werewolf in Paris	Amy Finch	
2001	You're Killing Me	Jamie Quinn	
2001	Amy's Orgasm	Nikki	
2001	Venus and Mars	Lisa	
2001	Joe Somebody	Meg Harper	
2002	Stella Shorts 1998–2002	Mother Nature	Short films
2005	Kids in America	Principal Donna Weller	
2005	Partner(s)	Katherine	
2007	Sex and Death 101	Fiona Wormwood	
2010	Crazy on the Outside	Christy	
2011	Jumping the Broom	Amy	
2011	Horrible Bosses	Rhonda Harken	
2012	Conception	Tiffany	
2012	Knife Fight	Peaches O'Dell	
2013	Scooby-Doo! Mecha Mutt Menace	Dr. Devon Albright (voice)	Direct-to-video film
2014	Planes: Fire & Rescue	Lil' Dipper (voice)	
2018	Life of the Party	Marcie Strong	
2020	Hubie Halloween	Violet Valentine	
2021	The Fallout	Patricia Cavell	
2021	Mixtape	Gail Moody	
2023	Prom Pact	—N/a	Executive producer
2023	Totally Killer	Pam Hughes	
2025	Happy Gilmore 2	Virginia Venit Gilmore	
TBA	Grown Ups 3		Filming

=== Television ===
Year	Title	Role	Notes
1992	Loving	Steffy	1 episode
1993	Lifestories: Families in Crisis	Chris	Episode: "No Visible Bruises: The Kate Koestner Story"
1993	Class of '96	Kristie Lewis	Episode: "Educating David"
1993	Acapulco H.E.A.T.	Danielle Perkins	Episode: "Code Name: Body Double"
1994	Runaway Daughters	Angie Gordon	Television film
1994	Where Are My Children?	Kirstie	Television film
1995	Extreme	Andie McDermott	Recurring role
1996	Party of Five	Shelley	Episode: "Unfair Advantage"
1996	Strange Luck	Leigh Anne	Episode: "Healing Hands"
1998	Three	Amanda Webb	2 episodes
1998–1999	ER	Roxanne Please	Recurring role (season 5)
1999	The Last Man on Planet Earth	Hope Chayse	Television film
2000	Oh Baby	Nikky	2 episodes
2000	Dawson's Creek	Aunt Gwen	Episode: "Stolen Kisses"
2000–2004	Ed	Carol Vessey	Main role
2005	Jake in Progress	Brooke	4 episodes
2005–2007	Lost	Sarah Shephard	Recurring role (season 1–3)
2005–2008	Boston Legal	Denise Bauer	Main role (season 2–3); guest role (season 5)
2007	Wainy Days	Cheryl	Episode: "Tough Guy"
2008	Weeds	Lisa Ferris	Recurring role (season 4)
2008	Law & Order: Special Victims Unit	Gwen Sibert	Episode: "Trials"
2009	True Jackson, VP	Claire Underwood	Episode: "True Takes Iceland"
2009	Monk	Marilyn Brody	Episode: "Mr. Monk and the Bully"
2009–2020	Modern Family	Claire Dunphy	Main role
2011	Scooby-Doo! Mystery Incorporated	Marion Spartan (voice)	Episode: "Attack of the Headless Horror"
2014	Family Guy	Claire Dunphy (voice)	2 episodes
2017	Family Guy	Herself (voice)	2 episodes
2015	Childrens Hospital	First Lady	Episode: "Codename: Jennifer"
2016	Better Things	Herself	Episode: "Sam/Pilot"
2017–2020	Rapunzel's Tangled Adventure	Queen Arianna (voice)	Main role
2017	MasterChef Junior	Herself	Episode: "A Presidential Mystery Box"
2017	Who Do You Think You Are	Herself	Episode: "Julie Bowen"
2017	The Mindy Project	Daisy	Episode: "Leo's Girlfriend"
2018	LA to Vegas	Gwen (voice)	Episode: "The Affair"
2019	DuckTales	Lieutenant Penumbra (voice)	Recurring role (season 2 & 3)
2020	Who Wants to Be a Millionaire	Herself	2 episodes
2020	A Modern Farewell	Herself	Modern Family documentary
2021	Curb Your Enthusiasm	Gabby McAfee	Episode: "IRASSHAIMASE!"
2022	American Dad!	Trashelle (voice)	Episode: "Langley Dollar Listings"
2023	Hailey's On It!	Patricia Banks (voice)	Recurring role
2023	StoryBots: Answer Time	Ms. Clown	Episode: "Stocks"
2023	Celebrity Wheel of Fortune	Herself	Episode: "RuPaul, Gayle King and Julie Bowen"
2024	Hysteria!	Linda Campbell	Main role
2025	Hollywood Squares	Herself	3 episodes

== Awards and nominations ==
Organizations	Year	Category	Work	Result	Ref.
Critics' Choice Television Awards	2011	Best Supporting Actress in a Comedy Series	Modern Family	Nominated	
Critics' Choice Television Awards	2012	Best Supporting Actress in a Comedy Series	Modern Family	Won	
Primetime Emmy Awards	2010	Outstanding Supporting Actress in a Comedy Series	Modern Family (episode: "My Funky Valentine")	Nominated	
Primetime Emmy Awards	2011	Outstanding Supporting Actress in a Comedy Series	Modern Family (episode: "Strangers on a Treadmill")	Won	
Primetime Emmy Awards	2012	Outstanding Supporting Actress in a Comedy Series	Modern Family (episode: "Go Bullfrogs!")	Won	
Primetime Emmy Awards	2013	Outstanding Supporting Actress in a Comedy Series	Modern Family (episode: "My Hero")	Nominated	
Primetime Emmy Awards	2014	Outstanding Supporting Actress in a Comedy Series	Modern Family (episode: "The Feud")	Nominated	
Primetime Emmy Awards	2015	Outstanding Supporting Actress in a Comedy Series	Modern Family (episode: "Valentine's Day 4: Twisted Sister")	Nominated	
Screen Actors Guild Awards	2005	Outstanding Ensemble in a Drama Series	Boston Legal	Nominated	
Screen Actors Guild Awards	2006	Outstanding Ensemble in a Drama Series	Boston Legal	Nominated	
Screen Actors Guild Awards	2007	Outstanding Ensemble in a Drama Series	Boston Legal	Nominated	
Screen Actors Guild Awards	2008	Outstanding Ensemble in a Comedy Series	Weeds	Nominated	
Screen Actors Guild Awards	2009	Outstanding Ensemble in a Comedy Series	Modern Family (season 1)	Nominated	
Screen Actors Guild Awards	2010	Outstanding Ensemble in a Comedy Series	Modern Family (season 2)	Won	
Screen Actors Guild Awards	2011	Outstanding Female Actor in a Comedy Series	Modern Family (season 3)	Nominated	
Screen Actors Guild Awards	2011	Outstanding Ensemble in a Comedy Series	Modern Family (season 3)	Won	
Screen Actors Guild Awards	2012	Outstanding Ensemble in a Comedy Series	Modern Family (season 4)	Won	
Screen Actors Guild Awards	2013	Outstanding Female Actor in a Comedy Series	Modern Family (season 5)	Nominated	
Screen Actors Guild Awards	2013	Outstanding Ensemble in a Comedy Series	Modern Family (season 5)	Won	
Screen Actors Guild Awards	2014	Outstanding Female Actor in a Comedy Series	Modern Family (season 6)	Nominated	
Screen Actors Guild Awards	2014	Outstanding Ensemble in a Comedy Series	Modern Family (season 6)	Nominated	
Screen Actors Guild Awards	2015	Outstanding Ensemble in a Comedy Series	Modern Family (season 7)	Nominated	
Screen Actors Guild Awards	2016	Outstanding Ensemble in a Comedy Series	Modern Family (season 8)	Nominated	
