= J. Millard Tawes =

American politician (1894-1979)

54th Governor of Maryland
- In office January 14, 1959 – January 25, 1967
- Preceded by: Theodore R. McKeldin
- Succeeded by: Spiro T. Agnew

Treasurer of Maryland
- In office June 1, 1973 – January 14, 1975
- Governor: Marvin Mandel
- Preceded by: John Luetkemeyer
- Succeeded by: William S. James

27th and 29th Comptroller of Maryland
- In office 1950–1959
- Governor: William Preston Lane Jr. Theodore Roosevelt McKeldin
- Preceded by: James J. Lacy
- Succeeded by: Louis L. Goldstein
- In office 1939–1947
- Governor: Herbert O'Conor
- Preceded by: William S. Gordy, Jr.
- Succeeded by: James J. Lacy

Personal details
- Born: John Millard Tawes; April 8, 1894 Crisfield, Maryland, U.S.
- Died: June 25, 1979 (aged 85) Crisfield, Maryland, U.S.
- Resting place: Sunny Ridge Memorial Park; Crisfield, Maryland
- Party: Democratic
- Spouse: Helen Avalynne Gibson (m. 1915)
- Children: 2

John Millard Tawes (April 8, 1894 – June 25, 1979), was an American politician and a member of the Democratic Party who was the 54th governor of Maryland from 1959 to 1967. He remains the only Maryland politician to be elected to the offices of state treasurer, comptroller, and governor.

== Early life and family ==
Tawes was born to James and Alice (née Byrd) Tawes in Crisfield, Maryland. He received his early education in the Somerset County, Maryland, public schools, and later attended Bryant and Stratton Business College where he studied banking and accounting. After college, Tawes earned a living working in lumbering and canning firms that were owned by his father, which later expanded into shipbuilding, baking, and banking. Tawes married Helen Avalynne Gibson on December 25, 1915; with her he had two children.

== Maryland political career ==
Tawes' political career began in 1930 when he was elected as clerk of the court for Somerset County, Maryland, narrowly defeating his opponent Harry T. Phoebus by 72 votes. After winning re-election in 1934, Tawes pursued state office. In 1938, he was elected Comptroller of Maryland, defeating Republican rival William G. Jack by 140,000 votes. Under Tawes, the state budget of Maryland nearly quadrupled in just six years. He was re-elected as Comptroller in 1942.

In 1946, Tawes ran for governor of Maryland but lost to William Preston Lane, Jr. in the Democratic primary. Tawes initially retired, but was appointed by Governor Lane to serve as a State Banking Commissioner in 1947. Tawes held that position until 1950, when he was appointed Comptroller to fill the vacancy caused by the resignation of James J. Lacy. He was re-elected to the office in 1950 and 1954.

== Governor of Maryland ==
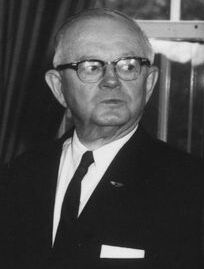
Tawes as governor.

In 1958, polling among Marylanders showed that Tawes was quite popular. This led Tawes to announce, for the second time, his candidacy for governor. He faced minor opposition in the primary, and defeated Republican James Devereux, a Congressman and veteran of World War II, by approximately 200,000 votes in the general election. On January 14, 1959, he was sworn in for his first term.

The beginning of Tawes' term as governor was benefited by the overwhelming Democratic majority present in both houses of the Maryland General Assembly. Seeking to improve the state's economy following a recession in 1958, Tawes established extensive departments and agencies that primarily regulated and assisted agriculture, industry, and the economy in general. He also established organizations to deal with the elderly, insurance, savings and loans, and justice. Seeking to improve the highway system, Tawes create the State Roads Commission that added over a thousand miles of major roads and highways to the state. Concerning environmental matters, Tawes established programs to help the oyster population within the Chesapeake Bay, established several island nature reserves, and doubled the size of the state park system. He also worked towards reducing water pollution and saving forests from destruction. Tawes also sought to phase out slot machines in Maryland, which was completed after he left office in 1968.

Regarding education, the state of Maryland saw significant strides in areas including the expansion of the University System of Maryland, the establishment of public educational television channels, and the creation of state agencies encouraging educational loans. Tawes would later remark that the educational strides under his administration should be regarded as the greatest accomplishment.

One of the major constitutional concerns during the Tawes Administration came from the reapportionment of districts within the state. When Maryland was granted an extra Congressional seat following the 1960 census, years of unsuccessful attempts to redraw the state districts resulted in a federal jury of three judges redrawing the boundaries in 1966. Regarding the General Assembly districts, Tawes oversaw the shift of power from the rural areas to the urban. Ever since the American Revolution, representation in the General Assembly was divided evenly for all counties, which meant the more numerous rural counties dominated politically. Following the series of "one man, one vote" decrees by the Supreme Court of the United States, a lower court in Maryland ruled the General Assembly districts unconstitutional. Tawes, a rural county politician himself, called the General Assembly into special session to redraw the districts, resulting in a substantial gain in representation in the State Senate and House of Delegates for the urban areas of the state for the first time.

In the election of 1962, Tawes faced substantial competition in the primary from David Hume, a critic of Tawes' conservation policies, and businessman George P. Mahoney. While both Hume and Mahoney polled impressively, Tawes managed to retain the Democratic nomination. His challenger in the general election, Congressman Frank Small, Jr., lost to Tawes by a margin of 78,000 votes, primarily due to Small's poorly managed campaign. Tawes' second administration began on January 9, 1963.

The Civil Rights Movement in the United States took place during the Tawes Administration. While Tawes was publicly neither strongly for or against discrimination, Maryland became the first state south of the Mason–Dixon line to enact a public accommodations laws under his administration, and he also directed the state government and its contractors to conduct anti-discriminatory hiring practices.

Many of the themes Tawes began in his first term were continued in his second, including educational reform. The allocation of state aid to educational institutions was recalculated by the legislature during his second term, resulting in increased funds being directed towards the most needy districts. Tawes also managed to establish an educational television network, which he had been campaigning for since his first term.

While Tawes had always maintained a platform of fiscal conservatism, spending by the state government doubled under his administration from approximately $448 million to over $1 billion. His final years in office involved the initiation of the review of the Maryland Constitution of 1867, and the establishment of commissions to remove areas of waste within the government. Both of these measures would not come to fruition until after he left office. Tawes's tenure as governor ended on January 25, 1967.

== Later life ==
When Tawes left his office as governor, he was given a 1967 Cadillac Fleetwood as a gift from his supporters. Soon after he was elected by the people of Somerset County to represent them in the Maryland Constitutional Convention of 1967/68. Tawes was voted honorary president by the members of the convention, but remained silent during the proceedings as to not give the impression of a conflict of interest. After all, it was Tawes who called for the convention whilst governor.

After the signing of the Constitutional ratifications, Tawes was appointed by his successor, Governor Spiro Agnew, to serve as Chairman of the Board of Natural Resources. Agnew's successor, Marvin Mandel, appointed Tawes as Secretary of the newly created Department of Natural Resources, where he served as an advocate for the protection and nurturing of Maryland's environment. Tawes' final service to the state came as Treasurer of Maryland, where he was chosen to fill an unexpired term from 1973 to 1975.

Tawes was found unconscious at his home in Crisfield on June 25, 1979, from what appeared to be a heart attack. After spending nearly an hour attempting to revive him, ambulance personnel and doctors on the scene determined that he could not be saved. He had been admitted to the hospital a month before complaining of chest pains, and two weeks prior due to a mild heart attack.

Following his death, Tawes was reflected upon as a moderate and calm political figure. While publicly seen as weak due to his age and often indirect administration methods, Tawes was capable of pushing legislation through the General Assembly when necessary, though he was not always eager to do so. He was also capable of appealing to both sides of an issue by maintaining a moderate record. Before his death, Tawes noted his proudest accomplishments revolved around leaving a state government that was fiscally sound, and also for improving the education system and establishing community colleges. He is buried in Sunny Ridge Memorial Park in his hometown of Crisfield.

== Building dedications ==
- The Tawes State Office Building in Annapolis, Maryland.
- J. Millard Tawes Historical Museum in Crisfield, Maryland.
- Tawes Fine Arts Building at the University of Maryland, College Park.
- Tawes Theatre at Washington College in Chestertown, Maryland.
- J. Millard Tawes College Center at Coppin State University in Baltimore, Maryland
- The J. Millard Tawes Gymnasium on the campus of University of Maryland Eastern Shore.
- Tawes Hall at Frostburg State University in Frostburg, Maryland
- The Tawes Building, Spring Grove Hospital Center

== In popular culture ==
In the film Hairspray (1988), Leo Rocca plays an unnamed Governor of Maryland. The film is set in 1962 during Tawes' first term. The character was left out of the musical stage adaptation of the film.

== See also ==
- J. Millard Tawes Historical Museum

Party political offices
Preceded by Curley Byrd	Democratic nominee for Governor of Maryland; 1958, 1962	Succeeded by George P. Mahoney
Political offices
Preceded by William S. Gordy, Jr.	Comptroller of Maryland; 1939–1947	Succeeded by James J. Lacy
Preceded by James J. Lacy	Comptroller of Maryland; 1950–1959	Succeeded by Louis L. Goldstein
Preceded by Theodore McKeldin	Governor of Maryland; January 14, 1959 – January 25, 1967	Succeeded by Spiro T. Agnew
Preceded by John Luetkemeyer	Treasurer of Maryland; 1973–1975	Succeeded by William S. James
