= Dude Ranch (disambiguation) =

A dude ranch, or guest ranch, is a type of ranch oriented towards visitors or tourism.

Dude Ranch may refer to:

- Dude Ranch (album), a 1997 album by Blink-182
- Dude Ranch (film), a 1931 western film
- "Dude Ranch" (Modern Family), a 2011 episode of the television series Modern Family
