= Phil on Wire =

- Modern Family episode
- Phil (Ty Burrell) walking on the tightrope
- Episode no.: Season 3 Episode 3
- Directed by: Jason Winer
- Story by: Bianca Douglas; Danny Zuker
- Teleplay by: Danny Zuker
- Production code: 3ARG01
- Original air date: September 28, 2011

Guest appearances
- Justin Kirk as Charlie Bingham; Lusia Strus as Officer Blevin; Jenica Bergere as Janet

Episode chronology
← Previous "When Good Kids Go Bad"	Next → "Door to Door"
- Modern Family season 3

"Phil on Wire" is the third episode of the third season of the American sitcom Modern Family and the show's 51st episode overall. The episode originally aired on September 28, 2011 on American Broadcasting Company (ABC). The episode was written by Danny Zuker, with the story co-written by Zucker and Bianca Douglas. Jason Winer directed the episode. Justin Kirk guest stars in the episode as Mitchell's boss, Charlie Bingham.

== Plot ==
Cam (Eric Stonestreet) decides to go on a juice fast and Mitch (Jesse Tyler Ferguson) tries to change his mind because he has a gathering at his boss' (Justin Kirk) house and Cam is not at his best when he is doing a juice fast. Cam takes Mitch's reaction as not supporting and then Mitch decides to go on juice fast with him to prove his support.

At the Dunphy's house, Phil (Ty Burrell) and Luke (Nolan Gould) are watching the Man on Wire and Phil gets inspired and attempts to go on a tightrope. Claire (Julie Bowen) tries to teach Alex (Ariel Winter) and Haley (Sarah Hyland) a life lesson after the girls fight for being in the same math class. She tells them that they have to rise above and work together to help each other. The girls take her advice but not the way Claire was hoping they would and they both end up in the principal's office. Coming back home, Phil successfully walks the tightrope and Claire realizes that all day she was trying to talk to the girls to teach them few things when Phil without saying anything, gave them a life lesson by actions.

The third story of the episode revolves around the growing bond between Jay (Ed O'Neill) and the dog Stella (Brigitte), something that gets on Gloria's (Sofía Vergara) nerves. Stella is chewing all of her shoes and in her attempt to make her chew some of Jay's shoes, she ends up humiliating herself in front of Jay and Manny (Rico Rodriguez).

== Production ==
"Phil on Wire" was written by Danny Zuker and is based on a story by Bianca Douglas and Danny Zuker, marking Zuker's twelfth writing credit for the series and Douglas's first. The episode was directed by Jason Winer, his second director's credit for the season. The episode was filmed between August 1 and August 3, 2011. Justin Kirk guest stars as Mitchell's boss, Charlie Bingham. Lusia Strus also guest stars in the episode as Officer Belvin, a cop with which Claire quickly becomes enemies.

== Reception ==
=== Ratings ===
In its original American broadcast, "Phil on Wire" was viewed by an estimated 13.45 million viewers and received a 5.7 rating/15% share among adults 18 to 49. This means that it was seen by 5.7% of all 18- to 49-year-olds, and 15% of all 18- to 49-year-olds watching television at the time of the broadcast. This marked an eight percent drop in the ratings from the previous episode, "Dude Ranch". Despite this, the episode also ranked as the highest-rated show on Wednesday. The episode also ranked first in its timeslot, beating the Fox reality series, The X Factor, CBS drama series Criminal Minds, NBC drama series Harry's Law and The CW reality series, America's Next Top Model. Added with DVR viewers, who viewed the episode within seven days of the original broadcast, the episode received an 8.1 rating in the 18–49 demographic, adding a 2.4 rating to the original viewership. The episode also received more than 18 million viewers, when adding DVR viewers. "Phil on Wire" was the second most-watched scripted show for the week of broadcast among adults aged 18–49 and the eleventh most watched show among all viewers.

=== Reviews ===
Episodes like “Manny Get Your Gun” and last week’s “When Good Kids Go Bad” take seemingly disparate storylines and fuse them successfully into one fully realized story. But more often than not, each family gets stranded in its own world.

— Ryan McGee, The A.V. Club

The episode received mixed reviews.

The A.V. Club reviewer Ryan McGee criticized the episode saying it had "an overflow of quality performers," calling it "a 'contractual obligation' episode, in which the three families barely intersect and all pretty much do their own thing". He ultimately gave the episode a B−.

CNN writer Henry Hanks called the episode "exemplary" commenting that in the final moments of the episode he "couldn't help but cheer Phil Dunphy as he went across that tightrope."

Michael Arbeiter of Hollywood praised the episode, specifically the ending writing that "This is where Modern Family’s strength comes in: it cherishes the idea of family. [...] And it isn’t at all hokey, because the very end of the episode has Phil admitting just how oblivious he is to all of the meaningful messages being embodied by his family members." He ultimately called the episode, "Very sweet, very funny."

While reviewing the first part of the third season, Slant Magazine reviewer Peter Swanson criticized the Mitchell/Cameron subplot, calling it an "unfunny farce." He went on to complement the Phil/Luke subplot calling it a "more effective narrative thread".
