= List of awards and nominations received by Entourage =

This is the list of awards won and nominations received by the American television series Entourage.

== Awards ==
=== Awards Won ===
BAFTA Awards:

- 2006: Best International Television Series

Emmy Awards:

- 2006: Outstanding Supporting Actor in a Comedy Series (Jeremy Piven for playing "Ari Gold")
- 2007: Outstanding Sound Mixing for a Comedy or Drama Series (Half-Hour) And Animation (for "One Day in the Valley")
- 2007: Outstanding Supporting Actor in a Comedy Series (Jeremy Piven for playing "Ari Gold")
- 2008: Outstanding Supporting Actor in a Comedy Series (Jeremy Piven for playing "Ari Gold")
- 2009: Outstanding Sound Mixing for a Comedy or Drama Series (Half-Hour) And Animation (for "Pie")
- 2010: Outstanding Sound Mixing for a Comedy or Drama Series (Half-Hour) And Animation (for "One Car, Two Car, Red Car, Blue Car")

Golden Globe Awards:

- 2007: Best Supporting Actor - Mini-Series or TV Film (Jeremy Piven for playing "Ari Gold")

Producers Guild of America:

- 2005: Producer of the Year - Episodic Comedy

Peabody Award:

- 2008

=== Nominations ===
Directors Guild of America:

- 2005: Outstanding Directing - Comedy Series (Julian Farino for "Exodus")
- 2006: Outstanding Directing - Comedy Series (Julian Farino for "One Day in the Valley")
- 2007: Outstanding Directing - Comedy Series (David Nutter for "The Resurrection")

Emmy Awards:

- 2005: Outstanding Casting - Comedy Series
- 2005: Outstanding Directing - Comedy Series (David Frankel for "Pilot")
- 2005: Outstanding Supporting Actor - Comedy Series (Jeremy Piven for playing "Ari Gold")
- 2006: Outstanding Casting - Comedy Series
- 2006: Outstanding Directing - Comedy Series (Daniel Attias for "Oh, Mandy")
- 2006: Outstanding Directing - Comedy Series (Julian Farino for "Sundance Kids")
- 2006: Outstanding Writing - Comedy Series (Doug Ellin for "Exodus")
- 2007: Outstanding Casting - Comedy Series
- 2007: Outstanding Directing - Comedy Series (Julian Farino for "One Day in the Valley")
- 2007: Outstanding Guest Actor - Comedy Series (Martin Landau for playing "Bob Ryan")
- 2007: Outstanding Comedy Series
- 2007: Outstanding Supporting Actor - Comedy Series (Kevin Dillon for playing "Johnny Chase")
- 2008: Outstanding Supporting Actor - Comedy Series (Kevin Dillon for playing "Johnny Chase")
- 2008: Outstanding Directing - Comedy Series (Dan Attias for "No Cannes Do")
- 2008: Outstanding Comedy Series
- 2009: Outstanding Comedy Series
- 2009: Outstanding Supporting Actor - Comedy Series (Kevin Dillon for playing "Johnny Chase")
- 2009: Outstanding Directing for a Comedy Series (Julian Farino for "Tree Trippers")

Golden Globe Awards:

- 2004: Best Series - Musical or Comedy
- 2004: Best Supporting Actor - Mini-Series or TV Film (Jeremy Piven for playing "Ari Gold")
- 2005: Best Series - Musical or Comedy
- 2005: Best Supporting Actor - Mini-Series or TV Film (Jeremy Piven for playing "Ari Gold")
- 2006: Best Series - Musical or Comedy
- 2006: Best Supporting Actor - Mini-Series or TV Film (Jeremy Piven for playing "Ari Gold")
- 2007: Best Series - Musical or Comedy
- 2007: Best Supporting Actor - Mini-Series or TV Film (Kevin Dillon for playing "Johnny Chase")
- 2008: Best Series - Musical or Comedy
- 2008: Best Actor - TV Series - Musical Or Comedy (Kevin Connolly for playing "Eric Murphy")
- 2008: Best Supporting Actor - Series, Mini-Series or TV Film (Jeremy Piven for playing "Ari Gold")
- 2009: Best Series - Musical or Comedy
- 2009: Best Supporting Actor - Series, Mini-Series or TV Film (Jeremy Piven for playing "Ari Gold")

Image Awards:

- 2007: Outstanding Directing - Comedy Series (Seith Mann for "Dream Team")

Producers Guild of America:

- 2007: Producer of the Year - Episodic Comedy

Satellite Awards:

- 2004: Outstanding Actor - Musical or Comedy Series (Kevin Connolly for playing "Eric Murphy")
- 2004: Outstanding DVD Release - TV Show (for "Season 1")
- 2004: Outstanding Series - Musical or Comedy
- 2005: Best Series - Musical or Comedy
- 2005: Best Supporting Actor - Mini-Series or TV Film (Jeremy Piven for playing "Ari Gold")

Screen Actors Guild:

- 2006: Outstanding Actor - Comedy Series (Jeremy Piven for playing "Ari Gold")
- 2006: Outstanding Cast - Comedy Series
- 2007: Outstanding Actor - Comedy Series (Jeremy Piven for playing "Ari Gold")
- 2007: Outstanding Cast - Comedy Series
- 2008: Outstanding Actor - Comedy Series (Jeremy Piven for playing "Ari Gold")
- 2008: Outstanding Cast - Comedy Series

Slammy Awards:

- 2015: Celebrity Moment of the Year

Writers Guild of America:

- 2005: Best Writing - Comedy Series
- 2006: Best Writing - Comedy Series
- 2007: Best Writing - Comedy Series
