= Primetime Emmy Award for Outstanding Sound Mixing for a Comedy or Drama Series (Half-Hour) and Animation =

Television award category

Primetime Emmy Award for Sound Mixing for a Comedy or Drama Series (Half-Hour) and Animation
- Awarded for: Outstanding Sound Mixing for a Comedy or Drama Series (Half-Hour) and Animation
- Country: United States
- Presented by: Academy of Television Arts & Sciences
- Currently held by: Widow's Bay (2026)
- Website: emmys.com

The Primetime Emmy Award for Outstanding Sound Mixing for a Comedy or Drama Series (Half-Hour) and Animation is an award handed out annually at the Creative Arts Emmy Awards.

In the following list, the first titles listed in gold are the winners; those not in gold are nominees, which are listed in alphabetical order. The years given are those in which the ceremonies took place:

== Winners and nominations ==
=== 1980s ===
Outstanding Tape Sound Mixing for a Series

Year	Program	Episode	Nominees	Network
1983 (35th)
1983 (35th)	Great Performances	"Dance in America: The Magic Flute"	Stu Fox, Mark Hanes, Dean Okrand, Ed Suski	NBC
1983 (35th)	Alice	"The Secret of Mel's Diner"	Jerry Clemans, Don Helvey	CBS
1983 (35th)	Benson	"Death in a Funny Position"	Ross Davis, Rich Jacob, Allen Patapoff	ABC
1983 (35th)	Solid Gold	"Barry Manilow"	Jerry Clemans, Paul Dobbe, Craig Porter, Dick Sarter	Syndicated
1983 (35th)	Star of the Family	"Pilot"	Chris Haire, Matt Hyde, Richard Jacob, Dick Wilson	ABC

Outstanding Live and Tape Sound Mixing and Sound Effects for a Series

Year	Program	Episode	Nominees	Network
1984 (36th)
1984 (36th)	Real People	"Hawaii Show — Sarah's Wedding"	Stu Fox, Mark Hanes, Dean Okrand, Ed Suski	NBC
1984 (36th)	Benson	"Down the Drain"	Ross Davis, Rich Jacob, Allen Patapoff	ABC
1984 (36th)	Cheers	"No Help Wanted"	Sam Black, Douglas Gray, Thomas Huth, Gordon Klimuck	NBC
1984 (36th)	Fame	"Break Dance"	John Oliver, Frank Wolf, Jerry Clemans, Ross Davis	Syndicated
1984 (36th)	Fame	"Lisa's Song"	John Oliver, Jerry Clemans, Paul Hochman, Lyle J. Burbridge	Syndicated
1985 (37th)
1985 (37th)	Cheers	"The Executive's Executioner"	Michael Ballin, Sam Black, Douglas Gray, Thomas Huth	NBC
1985 (37th)	The Cosby Show	"Goodbye Mr. Fish"	George Corrado, Allen Patapoff, Craig Porter, Allan Varner	NBC
1985 (37th)	The Cosby Show	"Presentation"	David E. Fluhr, Rich Jacob, Allen Patapoff, Maureen Teller	NBC
1985 (37th)	Ripley's Believe It or Not!	"Accident Research"	Thomas Huth, John Normann, Tim Philben, Harlan Riggs	ABC

Outstanding Sound Mixing for a Comedy Series or a Special

Year	Program	Episode	Nominees	Network
1986 (38th)
1986 (38th)	Cheers	"Fear Is My Co-Pilot"	Michael Ballin, Bob Douglas, Doug Grey, Tom Huth	NBC
1986 (38th)	The Cosby Show	"Happy Anniversary"	Richard Jacob, Allen Patapoff, Craig Porter	NBC
1986 (38th)	The Golden Girls	"Pilot"	Terri Lynn Fraser, Allen Patapoff, Craig Porter, Ken Quayle	NBC
1986 (38th)	Newhart	"Larry's Dead, Long Live Larry"	Andrew MacDonald, Bill Nicholson, Craig Porter, Richard Wachter	CBS
1987 (39th)
1987 (39th)	Cheers	"The Proposal"	Michael Ballin, Bob Douglas, Doug Grey, Tom Huth	NBC
1987 (39th)	The Cosby Show	"I Know That You Know"	Richard Jacob, Allen Patapoff, Craig Porter, Maureen Teller	NBC
1987 (39th)	Fame	"The Lounge Singer Who Knew Too Much"	Murray McFadden, Don Sharpless, Mike Stone, Fred Tator	Syndicated
1987 (39th)	The Golden Girls	"Ladies of the Evening"	Dick Burns, Ed Epstein, Allen Patapoff, Craig Porter	NBC
1987 (39th)	The Golden Girls	"A Piece of Cake"	Edward L. Moskowitz, John Orr, Allen Patapoff, Craig Porter	NBC
1988 (40th)
1988 (40th)	Frank's Place	"Food Fight"	Michael Ballin, Martin P. Church, Lenora Peterson, M. Curtis Price	CBS
1988 (40th)	Cheers	"The Last Angry Mailman"	Bob Douglas, Doug Gray, Thomas J. Huth, Pete San Filipo	NBC
1988 (40th)	The Golden Girls	"Old Friends"	Edward L. Moskowitz, Allen Patapoff, Craig Porter	NBC
1988 (40th)	The Smothers Brothers Comedy Hour: The 20th Reunion		David E. Fluhr, Carroll Pratt, Otto Svoboda	CBS
1989 (41st)
1989 (41st)	Night Court	"The Last Temptation of Mac"	Klaus Landsberg, Allen Patapoff, Craig Porter	NBC
1989 (41st)	Cheers	"Jumping Jerks"	Sam Black, Robert Crosby, Robert Douglass, Thomas J. Huth	NBC
1989 (41st)	The Golden Girls	"You Gotta Have Hope"	Edward L. Moskowitz, Allen Patapoff, Craig Porter	NBC
1989 (41st)	The Wonder Years	"Birthday Boy"	Agamemnon Andrianos, John L. Mack, David J. West, Ray West	ABC

=== 1990s ===
Year	Program	Episode	Nominees	Network
1990 (42nd)
1990 (42nd)	Cheers	"The Stork Brings a Crane"	Sam Black, Robert Crosby, Robert Douglass, Thomas J. Huth	NBC
1990 (42nd)	Designing Women	"Tornado Watch"	Anthony Costantini, Douglas N. Gray, Rick Himot, Larry LaSota	CBS
1990 (42nd)	Murphy Brown	"The Strike"	David E. Fluhr, John Hicks, Rick Himot	CBS
1990 (42nd)	The Simpsons	"The Call of the Simpsons"	Brad Brock, James Fitzpatrick, Gary Montgomery	Fox
1990 (42nd)	The Wonder Years	"St. Valentine's Day Massacre"	Agamemnon Andrianos, John L. Mack, David J. West, Ray West	ABC
1991 (43rd)
1991 (43rd)	Doogie Howser, M.D.	"Doogenstein"	Michael Getlin, Joe Kenworthy, Dean Okrand, R. William A. Thiederman	ABC
1991 (43rd)	Cheers	"The Days of Wine and Neuroses"	Sam Black, Robert Crosby, Robert Douglass, Thomas J. Huth	NBC
1991 (43rd)	Murphy Brown	"On Another Plane"	David E. Fluhr, John Hicks, Rick Himot	CBS
1991 (43rd)	The Simpsons	"Homer vs. Lisa and the 8th Commandment"	Brad Brock, James Fitzpatrick, Gary Montgomery, Brad Sherman	Fox
1991 (43rd)	The Wonder Years	"Little Debbie"	Agamemnon Andrianos, John L. Mack, Nello Torri, David J. West	ABC
1992 (44th)
1992 (44th)	Doogie Howser, M.D.	"Lonesome Doog"	Michael Getlin, Joe Kenworthy, Dean Okrand, R. William A. Thiederman	ABC
1992 (44th)	Brooklyn Bridge	"Get a Job"	Jim Fitzpatrick, Bruce Michaels, Gary Montgomery, David Schneiderman	CBS
1992 (44th)	Cheers	"Bar Wars IV: This Time It's for Real"	Sam Black, Robert Crosby, Robert Douglass, Thomas J. Huth	NBC
1992 (44th)	The Simpsons	"Treehouse of Horror II"	Brad Brock, Peter Cole, Anthony D'Amico, Gary Gegan	Fox
1992 (44th)	The Wonder Years	"Grandpa's Car"	Agamemnon Andrianos, Craig Hunter, Nello Torri, David J. West	ABC
1993 (45th)
1993 (45th)	Doogie Howser, M.D.	"Doogie Got a Gun"	Michael Getlin, Joe Kenworthy, Dean Okrand, R. William A. Thiederman	ABC
1993 (45th)	Brooklyn Bridge	"Wild Pitch"	Jim Fitzpatrick, Bruce Michaels, Gary Montgomery, David Ronne	CBS
1993 (45th)	Seinfeld	"The Airport"	Charlie McDaniel, Craig Porter, Peter A. San Filipo	NBC
1993 (45th)	The Simpsons	"Treehouse of Horror III"	Ronald L. Cox, Anthony D'Amico, Greg Orloff, R. Russell Smith	Fox
1993 (45th)	The Wonder Years	"Summer" / "Independence Day"	Agamemnon Andrianos, Craig Hunter, Nello Torri, David J. West	ABC
1994 (46th)
1994 (46th)	Mad About You	"Surprise"	John Bickelhaupt, Peter Damski, Marti D. Humphrey, Gary D. Rogers	NBC
1994 (46th)	Coach	"Pioneer Bowl"	Dana Mark McClure, Charlie McDaniel, Craig Porter	ABC
1994 (46th)	Frasier	"A Midwinter Night's Dream"	Sam Black, Robert Crosby, Bob Douglass, Thomas J. Huth	NBC
1994 (46th)	Home Improvement	"5th Anniversary Show"	John Bickelhaupt, Klaus Landsberg, Charlie McDaniel	ABC
1994 (46th)	Seinfeld	"The Bris"	Larry Ellena, Charlie McDaniel, Craig Porter, Peter A. San Filipo	NBC
1995 (47th)
1995 (47th)	Mad About You	"Up in Smoke"	John Bickelhaupt, Peter Damski, Marti D. Humphrey, Gary D. Rogers	NBC
1995 (47th)	Dream On	"The Taking of Pablum 1-2-3, Part 2"	Phil Brown, Anthony Constantini, Bob Douglass, Doug Gray	HBO
1995 (47th)	Frasier	"Adventures in Paradise, Part 2"	Bob Douglass, Thomas J. Huth, Dana Mark McClure, David M. Weishaar	NBC
1995 (47th)	Home Improvement	"Don't Tell Momma"	John Bickelhaupt, Klaus Landsberg, Charlie McDaniel, Craig Porter	ABC
1995 (47th)	Love & War	"10 Cents a Dance"	Phil Brown, Anthony Constantini, Bob Douglass, Doug Gray	CBS
1995 (47th)	The Simpsons	"Bart vs. Australia"	Ronald L. Cox, Anthony D'Amico, Greg Orloff, R. Russell Smith	Fox
1996 (48th)
1996 (48th)	Frasier	"Kisses Sweeter Than Wine"	Robert Douglass, Thomas J. Huth, Dana Mark McClure, David M. Weishaar	NBC
1996 (48th)	Cybill	"Zing!"	Jerry Clemans, Edward L. Moskowitz, Craig Porter	CBS
1996 (48th)	Home Improvement	"A Taylor Runs Through It"	John Bickelhaupt, Klaus Landsberg, Charlie McDaniel, Kathy Oldham	ABC
1996 (48th)	Mad About You	"New Year's Eve"	John Bickelhaupt, Peter Damski, Marti D. Humphrey, Ray O'Reilly	NBC
1996 (48th)	Seinfeld	"The Cadillac"	Robert Douglass, Thomas J. Huth, Dana Mark McClure, David M. Weishaar	NBC
1997 (49th)
1997 (49th)	3rd Rock from the Sun	"A Nightmare on Dick Street"	Todd Grace, Jesse Peck, Craig Porter	NBC
1997 (49th)	Frasier	"Liar, Liar!"	Andre Caporaso, Robert Douglass, Dana Mark McClure, John F. Reiner	NBC
1997 (49th)	Home Improvement	"Wilson's World"	John Bickelhaupt, Klaus Landsberg, Charlie McDaniel, Kathy Oldham	ABC
1997 (49th)	The Larry Sanders Show	"Ellen, or Isn't She?"	John Bickelhaupt, Ed Golya, Edward L. Moskowitz	HBO
1997 (49th)	The Simpsons	"Brother from Another Series"	Ron Cox, Greg Orloff, R. Russell Smith	Fox
1998 (50th)
1998 (50th)	Ally McBeal	"Boy to the World"	Kurt Kassulke, Peter R. Kelsey, Paul M. Lewis, Nello Torri	Fox
1998 (50th)	Frasier	"Beware of Greeks"	Andre Caporaso, Robert Douglass, Dana Mark McClure, John F. Reiner	NBC
1998 (50th)	Home Improvement	"A Night to Dismember"	John Bickelhaupt, Klaus Landsberg, Charlie McDaniel, Kathy Oldham	ABC
1998 (50th)	The Larry Sanders Show	"Flip"	John Bickelhaupt, Ed Golya, Edward L. Moskowitz	HBO
1998 (50th)	3rd Rock from the Sun	"36! 24! 36! Dick!"	Todd Grace, Kathy Oldham, Jesse Peck, Craig Porter	NBC
1999 (51st)
1999 (51st)	Ally McBeal	"Love's Illusions"	Peter R. Kelsey, Paul M. Lewis, Nello Torri	Fox
1999 (51st)	Frasier	"Three Valentines"	Andre Caporaso, Robert Douglass, Thomas J. Huth, Dana Mark McClure	NBC
1999 (51st)	Friends	"The One with All the Thanksgivings"	John Bickelhaupt, Dana Mark McClure, Charlie McDaniel, Kathy Oldham	NBC
1999 (51st)	Home Improvement	"Love's Labor Lost, Part 1"	John Bickelhaupt, Klaus Landsberg, Charlie McDaniel, Kathy Oldham	ABC
1999 (51st)	3rd Rock from the Sun	"Dick's Big Giant Headache"	Todd Grace, Jesse Peck, Craig Porter	NBC

=== 2000s ===
Year	Program	Episode	Nominees	Network
2000 (52nd)
2000 (52nd)	Ally McBeal	"Car Wash"	Peter R. Kelsey, Paul M. Lewis, Nello Torri	Fox
2000 (52nd)	Frasier	"Something Borrowed, Someone Blue"	Andre Caporaso, Robert Douglass, Thomas J. Huth, Dana Mark McClure	NBC
2000 (52nd)	Friends	"The One After Vegas"	John Bickelhaupt, Dana Mark McClure, Charles McDaniel III, Kathy Oldham	NBC
2000 (52nd)	Sex and the City	"Ex and the City"	Robert Chefalas, T.J. O'Mara, Paul Zydel	HBO
2000 (52nd)	Spin City	"Goodbye"	Rich Jacob, John McDonald, George Meyer, Craig Porter	ABC
2000 (52nd)	3rd Rock from the Sun	"Dick and Harry Fall in a Hole"	Todd Grace, Jesse Peck, Craig Porter	NBC

From 2001 to 2006, categories were divided with single-camera sitcoms competing for Outstanding Single-Camera Sound Mixing for a Series.

Outstanding Multi-Camera Sound Mixing for a Series or a Special

Year	Program	Episode	Nominees	Network
2001 (53rd)
2001 (53rd)	Everybody Loves Raymond	"Italy"	Anthony Constantini, Doug Gray, Rick Himot, Brentley Walton	CBS
2001 (53rd)	The Drew Carey Show	"Drew Live II"	Klaus Landsberg	ABC
2001 (53rd)	Frasier	"Hooping Cranes"	Andre Caporaso, Robert Douglass, Thomas J. Huth, Dana Mark McClure	NBC
2002 (54th)
2002 (54th)	Frasier	"Bla-Z-Boy"	Andre Caporaso, Robert Douglass, Thomas J. Huth, Dana Mark McClure	NBC
2002 (54th)	Everybody Loves Raymond	"It's Supposed to Be Fun"	Anthony Constantini, Doug Gray, Rick Himot, Brentley Walton	CBS
2002 (54th)	Friends	"The One Where Rachel Has a Baby"	John Bickelhaupt, Dana Mark McClure, Charles McDaniel III, Kathy Oldham	NBC
2002 (54th)	Will & Grace	"Fagel Attraction"	Peter Damski, Todd Grace, Craig Porter	NBC
2003 (55th)
2003 (55th)	Everybody Loves Raymond	"She's the One"	Rick Himot, Kathy Oldham, Brentley Walton	CBS
2003 (55th)	Frasier	"Daphne Does Dinner"	Andre Caporaso, Robert Douglass, Thomas J. Huth, Dana Mark McClure	NBC
2003 (55th)	Friends	"The One in Barbados"	John Bickelhaupt, Dana Mark McClure, Charles McDaniel III	NBC
2003 (55th)	That '70s Show	"The Crunge"	Charles McDaniel III, Craig Porter, Vince Rohr	Fox
2003 (55th)	Will & Grace	"Bacon and Eggs"	Peter Damski, Kathy Oldham, Craig Porter	NBC
2004 (56th)
2004 (56th)	Frasier	"The Doctor Is Out"	Andre Caporaso, Robert Douglass, Thomas J. Huth, Dana Mark McClure	NBC
2004 (56th)	Everybody Loves Raymond	"The Model"	John Bickelhaupt, Kathy Oldham, Brentley Walton	CBS
2004 (56th)	Friends	"The Last One"	John Bickelhaupt, Dana Mark McClure, Charles McDaniel III	NBC
2004 (56th)	Will & Grace	"Courting Disaster"	Peter Damski, Kathy Oldham, Craig Porter	NBC
2005 (57th)
2005 (57th)	Two and a Half Men	"Can You Eat Human Flesh with Wooden Teeth?"	Bob LaMasney, Charlie McDaniel, Kathy Oldham, Bruce Peters	CBS
2005 (57th)	Everybody Loves Raymond	"Boys' Therapy"	John Bickelhaupt, Kathy Oldham, Brentley Walton	CBS
2005 (57th)	That '70s Show	"Angie"	Charles McDaniel III, Craig Porter, Vince Rohr	Fox
2005 (57th)	Will & Grace	"Friends with Benefits" / "Kiss and Tell"	Peter Damski, Kathy Oldham, Craig Porter	NBC
2006 (58th)
2006 (58th)	The West Wing	"The Debate"	Ed Greene, Andy Strauber	CBS
2006 (58th)	Two and a Half Men	"The Unfortunate Little Schnauzer"	Bob La Masney, Charlie McDaniel, Kathy Oldham, Bruce Peters	CBS

Outstanding Sound Mixing for a Comedy or Drama Series (Half-Hour) and Animation

Year	Program	Episode	Nominees	Network
2007 (59th)
2007 (59th)	Entourage	"One Day in the Valley"	Tom Stasinis, Dennis Kirk, Bill Jackson	HBO
2007 (59th)	Scrubs	"My Musical"	Joe Foglia, Eric Pierce, John W. Cook II, Peter Nusbaum	NBC
2007 (59th)	My Name Is Earl	"Our Cops Is On!"	C. Darin Knight, David Rawlinson, Peter Kelsey	NBC
2007 (59th)	The Office	"The Coup"	Benjamin Patrick, John W. Cook II, Peter Nusbaum	NBC
2007 (59th)	30 Rock	"Corporate Crush"	Griffin Richardson, Tony Pipitone, Bill Marino	NBC
2008 (60th)
2008 (60th)	30 Rock	"Episode 210"	Griffin Richardson, Tony Pipitone, Bill Marino	NBC
2008 (60th)	Entourage	"Adios Amigos"	Steve Morantz, Dennis Kirk, Bill Jackson	HBO
2008 (60th)	The Office	"Local Ad"	Benjamin Patrick, John W. Cook II, Peter Nusbaum	NBC
2008 (60th)	Two and a Half Men	"Is There a Mrs. Waffles?"	Bruce Peters, Kathy Oldham, Charlie McDaniel, Bob La Masney	CBS
2008 (60th)	Weeds	"Go"	Susan Moore-Chong, Chris Philp, Fred Tator	Showtime
2009 (61st)
2009 (61st)	Entourage	"Pie"	Tom Stasinis, Dennis Kirk, Bill Jackson	HBO
2009 (61st)	Weeds	"The Three Coolers"	Jon Ailetcher, Fred Tator, Chris Philp	Showtime
2009 (61st)	Flight of the Conchords	"Unnatural Love"	Alex Sullivan, Brian Riordan	HBO
2009 (61st)	The Office	"Michael Scott Paper Company"	Benjamin Patrick, John W. Cook II, Peter Nusbaum	NBC
2009 (61st)	Scrubs	"My Jerks"	Joe Foglia, Eric Pierce, John W. Cook II, Peter Nusbaum	ABC
2009 (61st)	30 Rock	"Kidney Now!"	Griffin Richardson, Tony Pipitone	NBC

=== 2010s ===
Year	Program	Episode	Nominees	Network
2010 (62nd)
2010 (62nd)	Entourage	"One Car, Two Car, Red Car, Blue Car"	Alec St. John, Todd Orr, Tom Stasinis, Dennis Kirk	HBO
2010 (62nd)	Modern Family	"En Garde"	Stephen Tibbo, Brian Harman, Dean Okrand	ABC
2010 (62nd)	The Office	"Niagara"	Benjamin Patrick, John W. Cook II, Peter Nusbaum	NBC
2010 (62nd)	30 Rock	"Argus"	Griffin Richardson, Tony Pipitone, Bill Marino	NBC
2010 (62nd)	Two and a Half Men	"Fart Jokes, Pie and Celeste"	Bruce Peters, Bob La Masney, Kathy Oldham	CBS
2011 (63rd)
2011 (63rd)	Family Guy	"Road to the North Pole"	Patrick S. Clark, Jim Fitzpatrick	Fox
2011 (63rd)	Californication	"The Last Supper"	Daniel P. Church, Ed Carr, Todd Grace	Showtime
2011 (63rd)	Modern Family	"Halloween"	Stephen Tibbo, Dean Okrand, Brian Harman	ABC
2011 (63rd)	The Office	"Andy's Play"	Benjamin Patrick, John W. Cook II, Peter Nusbaum	NBC
2011 (63rd)	Parks and Recreation	"Andy and April's Fancy Party"	Steve Morantz, John W. Cook II, Peter Nusbaum	NBC
2012 (64th)
2012 (64th)	Modern Family	"Dude Ranch"	Stephen Tibbo, Dean Okrand, Brian Harman	ABC
2012 (64th)	Entourage	"The End"	Tom Stasinis, Dennis Kirk, Todd Orr	HBO
2012 (64th)	Nurse Jackie	"Handle Your Scandal"	Jan McLaughlin, Peter Waggoner	Showtime
2012 (64th)	Parks and Recreation	"End of the World"	John W. Cook II, Peter Nusbaum, Steve Morantz	NBC
2012 (64th)	30 Rock	"Live from Studio 6H"	Robert Palladino, Marty Brumbach, Josiah Gluck, William Taylor	NBC
2013 (65th)
2013 (65th)	Nurse Jackie	"Teachable Moments"	Jan McLaughlin, Peter Waggoner	Showtime
2013 (65th)	Modern Family	"My Hero"	Stephen Tibbo, Brian Harman, Dean Okrand	ABC
2013 (65th)	The Office	"Finale"	Benjamin Patrick, John W. Cook II, Robert Carr	NBC
2013 (65th)	Parks and Recreation	"Leslie and Ben"	Steve Morantz, John W. Cook II, Ken Kobett	NBC
2013 (65th)	30 Rock	"Mazel Tov, Dummies!"	Griffin Richardson, Tony Pipitone	NBC
2014 (66th)
2014 (66th)	Nurse Jackie	"The Lady with the Lamp"	Jan McLaughlin, Peter Waggoner	Showtime
2014 (66th)	Californication	"Kickoff"	Daniel P. Church, Todd Grace, Ed Carr	Showtime
2014 (66th)	Modern Family	"The Wedding, Part 1"	Stephen Tibbo, Dean Okrand, Brian Harman	ABC
2014 (66th)	The Simpsons	"Married to the Blob"	Mark Linden, Tara A. Paul	Fox
2014 (66th)	Veep	"Detroit"	William F. MacPherson, Richard Davey	HBO
2015 (67th)
2015 (67th)	Modern Family	"Connection Lost"	Stephen Tibbo, Dean Okrand, Brian Harman, David Torres	ABC
2015 (67th)	Parks and Recreation	"One Last Ride"	George Flores, John W. Cook II, William Freesh	NBC
2015 (67th)	Silicon Valley	"Server Space"	Benjamin Patrick, Elmo Ponsdomenech, Todd Beckett	HBO
2015 (67th)	The Simpsons	"Simpsorama"	Tara A. Paul, Mark Linden	Fox
2015 (67th)	Veep	"Mommy Meyer"	William F. MacPherson, Richard Davey	HBO
2016 (68th)
2016 (68th)	Mozart in the Jungle	"Nothing Resonates Like Rhinoceros Foreskin"	Thomas Varga, Andy D'Addario, Bill Higley, Chris Navarro	Amazon
2016 (68th)	Modern Family	"The Storm"	Stephen Tibbo, Dean Okrand, Brian Harman	ABC
2016 (68th)	Silicon Valley	"Bachmanity Insanity"	Benjamin Patrick, Elmo Ponsdomenech, Todd Beckett	HBO
2016 (68th)	The Simpsons	"Halloween of Horror"	Tara A. Paul, Mark Linden	Fox
2016 (68th)	Veep	"Congressional Ball"	William F. MacPherson, John W. Cook II, Bill Freesh	HBO
2017 (69th)
2017 (69th)	Mozart in the Jungle	"Now I Will Sing"	Andy D'Addario, Gary Gegan, Marco Fiumara, Clark Germain	Amazon
2017 (69th)	Master of None	"The Dinner Party"	Joshua Berger, Michael Barosky	Netflix
2017 (69th)	Modern Family	"Basketball"	Dean Okrand, Brian R. Harman, Stephen A. Tibbo	ABC
2017 (69th)	Silicon Valley	"Intellectual Property"	Elmo Ponsdomenech, Todd Beckett, Benjamin Patrick	HBO
2017 (69th)	Veep	"Omaha"	John W. Cook II, Bill Freesh, Bill MacPherson	HBO
2018 (70th)
2018 (70th)	Barry	"Chapter Seven: Loud, Fast and Keep Going"	Todd Beckett, Elmo Ponsdomenech, Benjamin Patrick	HBO
2018 (70th)	Family Guy	"Three Directors"	Jim Fitzpatrick, Patrick Clark and Aaron Diecker	Fox
2018 (70th)	Modern Family	"Lake Life"	Brian R. Harman, Dean Okrand, Stephen A. Tibbo	ABC
2018 (70th)	Mozart in the Jungle	"Domo Arigato"	Andy D'Addario, Chris Jacobson, Ryotaro Harada	Amazon
2018 (70th)	Silicon Valley	"Fifty-One Percent"	Todd Beckett, Elmo Ponsdomenech, Benjamin Patrick	HBO
2019 (71st)
2019 (71st)	Barry	"ronny/lily"	Elmo Ponsdomenech, Jason "Frenchie" Gaya, Aaron Hasson, Benjamin Patrick	HBO
2019 (71st)	The Kominsky Method	"Chapter 1: An Actor Avoids"	Yuri Reese, Bill Smith, Michael Hoffman	Netflix
2019 (71st)	Modern Family	"A Year of Birthdays"	Dean Okrand, Brian R. Harman, Stephen A. Tibbo	ABC
2019 (71st)	Russian Doll	"The Way Out"	Lewis Goldstein, Phil Rosati	Netflix
2019 (71st)	Veep	"Veep"	John W. Cook II, Bill Freesh, Bill MacPherson	HBO

=== 2020s ===
Year	Program	Episode	Nominees	Network
2020 (72nd)
2020 (72nd)	The Mandalorian	"Chapter 2: The Child"	Shawn Holden, Bonnie Wild, Chris Fogel	Disney+
2020 (72nd)	Modern Family	"Finale, Part 1"	Dean Okrand, Srdjan Popovic, Brian R. Harman, Peter Bawiec, Stephen A. Tibbo	ABC
2020 (72nd)	The Ranch	"Fadeaway"	Laura L. King, Bob La Masney, Kathy Oldham	Netflix
2020 (72nd)	Schitt's Creek	"Happy Ending"	Bryan Day, Martin Lee	Pop TV
2020 (72nd)	Space Force	"Save Epsilon 6!"	Ben Patrick, John W. Cook II, Bill Freesh	Netflix
2021 (73rd)
2021 (73rd)	Ted Lasso	"The Hope That Kills You"	Ryan Kennedy, Sean Byrne, David Lascelles	Apple TV+
2021 (73rd)	B Positive	"High Risk Factor"	Bob LaMasney, Jeff A. Johnson	CBS
2021 (73rd)	Cobra Kai	"December 19"	Joe DeAngelis, Chris Carpenter, Mike Filosa, Phil McGowan	Netflix
2021 (73rd)	Hacks	"Falling"	John W. Cook II, Ben Wilkins, Jim Lakin	HBO Max
2021 (73rd)	The Kominsky Method	"Chapter 21. Near, Far, Wherever You Are"	Yuri Reese, Sean Madsen, Brian Wittle	Netflix
2022 (74th)
2022 (74th)	Only Murders in the Building	"The Boy from 6B"	Lindsey Alvarez, Mathew Waters, Joseph White Jr., Alan DeMoss	Hulu
2022 (74th)	Barry	"all the sauces"	Elmo Ponsdomenech, Teddy Salas, Scott Harber	HBO
2022 (74th)	Curb Your Enthusiasm	"IRASSHAIMASE!"	Earl Martin, Chuck Buch, Michael Miller	HBO
2022 (74th)	Hacks	"The Captain's Wife"	John W. Cook II, Ben Wilkins, Jim Lakin	HBO Max
2022 (74th)	Ted Lasso	"Rainbow"	Ryan Kennedy, Sean Byrne, David Lascelles, Arno Stephanian	Apple TV+
2022 (74th)	What We Do in the Shadows	"The Casino"	Diego Gat, Sam Ejnes, Rob Beal	FX
2023 (75th)
2023 (75th)	The Bear	"Review"	Steve "Major" Giammaria, Scott D. Smith	FX
2023 (75th)	Barry	"wow"	Elmo Ponsdomenech, Teddy Salas, Scott Harber, Aaron Hasson	HBO
2023 (75th)	The Mandalorian	"Chapter 24: The Return"	Scott R. Lewis, Tony Villaflor, Shawn Holden, Chris Fogel	Disney+
2023 (75th)	Only Murders in the Building	"The Tell"	Penny Harold, Andrew Lange, Joseph White Jr., Alan DeMoss	Hulu
2024 (76th)
2024 (76th)	The Bear	"Forks"	Steve "Major" Giammaria, Scott D. Smith, Patrick Christensen, Ryan Collison	FX
2024 (76th)	Curb Your Enthusiasm	"Ken/Kendra"	Earl Martin, Chuck Buch, Trino Madriz, Sam C. Lewis	HBO
2024 (76th)	Hacks	"Just for Laughs"	John W. Cook II, Ben Wilkins, Jim Lakin	Max
2024 (76th)	Only Murders in the Building	"Sitzprobe"	Mathew Waters, Lindsey Alvarez, Joseph White Jr., Alan DeMoss, Derik Lee	Hulu
2024 (76th)	What We Do in the Shadows	"Local News"	Diego Gat, Samuel Ejnes, Rob Beal	FX
2025 (77th)
2025 (77th)	The Studio	"The Golden Globes"	Lindsey Alvarez, Fred Howard, Buck Robinson, Ron Mellegers	Apple TV+
2025 (77th)	The Bear	"Doors"	Scott D. Smith, Steve "Major" Giammaria, Patrick Christensen, Ryan Collison	FX
2025 (77th)	Mid-Century Modern	"Sour Pickleball"	Peter Nusbaum, Whitney Purple, Jeff A. Johnson	Hulu
2025 (77th)	Only Murders in the Building	"Once Upon a Time in the West"	Mathew Waters, Kyle O'Neal, Joseph White Jr., Alan DeMoss	Hulu
2025 (77th)	Shrinking	"The Drugs Don't Work"	Earl Martin, Anna D. Wilborn, Alex Jongbloed, Trino Madriz	Apple TV+
2026 (78th)
2026 (78th)	Widow's Bay	"What to Expect on Your Trip"	Tim Hoogenakker, Larry Benjamin, Kevin Parker, Scott Michael Smith, Judah Getz, Ryan Collison	Apple TV
2026 (78th)	The Bear	"Scallop"	Steve "Major" Giammaria, Scott D. Smith, Patrick Christensen, Ryan Collison, Connor Nagy	FX
2026 (78th)	Hacks	"The Garden"	John W. Cook II, James Parnell, Jim Lakin, Fernanda Domene, David Stal, Jacob McNaughton	HBO Max
2026 (78th)	Shrinking	"I Will Be Grape"	Earl Martin, Anna D. Wilborn, Jamison Rabbe, Tami Treadwell, Jeffrey Roy, Alex Jongbloed	Apple TV
2026 (78th)	Tires	"The Tri-State Mid Market Tire Expo"	Brian Bracken, Jackson Derbish	Netflix

== Programs with multiple awards ==
4 awards

- Cheers

3 awards

- Doogie Howser, M.D.
- Entourage
- Frasier
- Modern Family

2 awards

- Barry
- The Bear
- Mad About You
- The Mandalorian (Note: Total includes The Mandalorian’s win for Outstanding Sound Mixing for a Comedy or Drama Series (One-Hour).)
- Mozart in the Jungle
- Nurse Jackie

== Mixers with multiple awards ==
8 awards

- Dean Okrand

7 awards

- Thomas J. Huth

6 awards

- Robert Douglass

4 awards

- Michael Ballin
- Doug Gray

3 awards

- Michael Getlin
- Brian Harman
- Peter R. Kelsey
- Joe Kenworthy
- Dennis Kirk
- Paul K. Lewis
- Dana Mark McClure
- Tom Stasinis
- R. William A. Thiederman
- Stephen A. Tibbo
- Nello Torri

2 awards

- Sam Black
- John Bickelhaupt
- Andre Caporaso
- Andy D'Addario
- Peter Damski
- Chris Fogel
- Stu Fox
- Mark Hanes
- Rick Himot
- Shawn Holden
- Martin D. Humphrey
- Bill Jackson
- Jan McLaughlin
- Kathy Oldham
- Benjamin Patrick
- Elmo Ponsdomenech
- Craig Porter
- Gary D. Rogers
- Ed Suski
- Peter Waggoner
- Brentley Walton
- Bonnie Wild

== Programs with multiple nominations ==
11 nominations

- Frasier
- Modern Family

9 nominations

- Cheers
- The Simpsons

6 nominations

- Home Improvement
- The Office
- 30 Rock

5 nominations

- Entourage
- Everybody Loves Raymond
- Friends
- The Golden Girls
- Veep
- The Wonder Years

4 nominations

- Barry
- The Bear
- The Cosby Show
- Hacks
- Only Murders in the Building
- Parks and Recreation
- Silicon Valley
- 3rd Rock from the Sun
- Two and a Half Men
- Will & Grace

3 nominations

- Ally McBeal
- Doogie Howser, M.D.
- Fame
- Mad About You
- The Mandalorian (Note: Total includes The Mandalorian’s nomination for Outstanding Sound Mixing for a Comedy or Drama Series (One-Hour).)
- Mozart in the Jungle
- Nurse Jackie
- Seinfeld

2 nominations

- Benson
- Brooklyn Bridge
- Californication
- Curb Your Enthusiasm
- Family Guy
- The Kominsky Method
- The Larry Sanders Show
- Murphy Brown
- Scrubs
- Shrinking
- Ted Lasso
- That '70s Show
- Weeds
- What We Do in the Shadows
