= When Good Kids Go Bad =

- Modern Family episode
- Claire (Julie Bowen) shows the family a security tape of the supermarket where Phil (Ty Burrell) accidentally pushes her.
- Episode no.: Season 3 Episode 2
- Directed by: Michael Spiller
- Written by: Jeffrey Richman
- Production code: 3ARG02
- Original air date: September 21, 2011

Guest appearance
- Laurel Coppock as Miss Elaine

Episode chronology
← Previous "Dude Ranch"	Next → "Phil on Wire"
- Modern Family season 3

"When Good Kids Go Bad" is the second episode of the American sitcom Modern Family's third season and the 50th episode overall. The episode originally aired on September 21, 2011 on American Broadcasting Company (ABC) and ran back-to-back with "Dude Ranch" in a one-hour timeslot. The episode was written by Jeffrey Richman and directed by Michael Spiller.

"When Good Kids Go Bad" was viewed by 14.53 million viewers and received positive reviews from critics with particular praise for the collage of moments between Cameron (Eric Stonestreet) and Lily (Aubrey Anderson-Emmons) from Sandra Gonzalez of Entertainment Weekly and Donna Bowman of The A.V. Club. Despite the positive commentaries, the storyline for Claire (Julie Bowen) was criticized by Alan Sepinwall of HitFix.

== Plot ==
Claire (Julie Bowen) and her husband Phil (Ty Burrell) go to the grocery store. The latter flirts with an attractive woman and accidentally pushes Claire into a pile of peach cans, but thinks he never did it. Luke (Nolan Gould), Alex (Ariel Winter) and Haley (Sarah Hyland) take Phil's side on the dispute. To prove that she is right, Claire manages to take the security tape from the grocery store and when she describes how she did it, Phil and the kids assert that she has an illness of proving others wrong.

Gloria (Sofía Vergara) gets a call from the principal of Manny's school that Manny (Rico Rodriguez) allegedly stole a girl's locket. Gloria is in disbelief about this, but Jay (Ed O'Neill) confronts him in the garage and Manny confesses to have stolen the locket. Manny tells his mother about the situation and Gloria yells at him. However, when they enter the school, Gloria notices how sad Manny is, and breaks into the girl's locker and slips the locket inside.

Haley and Alex trick Luke into moving into the attic so they can each have their own room. Luke figures out what they are doing but decides to move anyway because of a line of ants that is in his closet. Claire disagrees with the idea, and she tells Luke that the attic is cold and that he will also be scared. Luke moves in anyway but at the end he is really scared and cold and agrees to move back to his room.

Mitchell (Jesse Tyler Ferguson) and Cameron (Eric Stonestreet) are planning to have the family over to announce their plan to adopt a new baby but are concerned about Lily's (Aubrey Anderson-Emmons) reaction, as she is overprotective of Cameron, who Mitchell suggests this is because Cam is too possessive of her and coddles her too much. Cameron denies that he spoils her, but evidence suggests otherwise. Lily's preschool teacher later tells Mitchell that Lily has a problem with sharing, and suggests that she may get it from a parent, causing Mitchell to realize that he too has a problem with sharing.

== Production ==
"When Good Kids Go Bad" was written by Jeffrey Richman and directed by Michael Spiller. It aired on September 21, 2011, back-to-back with the third-season premiere, "Dude Ranch". "When Good Kids Go Bad" was filmed around the time of August 10, 2011. Although it aired after the season premiere, this episode was filmed before it due to the fact that "Dude Ranch" was filmed on location in Jackson Hole, Wyoming.

== Reception ==
=== Ratings ===
In its original American broadcast, "When Good Kids Go Bad" alongside "Dude Ranch", was viewed by an estimated 14.53 million viewers and received a 6.1 rating/15% share among adults between the ages of 18 and 49. This means that it was seen by 6.1% of all 18- to 49-year-olds, and 15% of all 18- to 49-year-olds watching television at the time of the broadcast. The episode became the highest-rated and most-viewed episode of the series. This marked an 18% rise in the ratings from the second-season premiere, "The Old Wagon", making it the highest-rated and most-viewed episode of the series and became ABC's top-rated season premiere in six years. The episode also ranked first in its timeslot, beating the highly promoted new Fox reality series The X Factor, CBS drama series Criminal Minds, NBC drama series Harry's Law and CW reality series, America's Next Top Model.

=== Reviews ===
"When Good Kids Go Bad" received mostly positive reviews.

Maris Kreizman of Vulture called the episode "not all that surprising and a little sentimental, but charming nonetheless." She also complimented the performance of Lily (Aubrey Anderson-Emmons) calling her a "pleasant surprise" and that "she’s at her best when she’s surly, particularly when she deadpans about her future little brother: 'No, I hate the baby.' 'I wanna make the baby dead.'"

Alan Sepinwall from HitFix regarded the episode as the strongest part of the one hour timeslot, but was still underwhelming for Sepinwall, as he criticized the storyline for Claire (Julie Bowen) and described the character as "unpleaseant to watch".

Donna Bowman from The A.V. Club gave both episodes a B rate stating about "When Good Kids Go Bad" that "...the episode as a whole seems unconnected, overstuffed, and occasionally poorly motivated."
