= Hit and Run (Modern Family) =

- Modern Family episode
- Cam (Eric Stonestreet), Jay (Ed O'Neill), Mitch (Jesse Tyler Ferguson) and Phil (Ty Burrell) before they deal with the person who took Haley's money.
- Episode no.: Season 3 Episode 5
- Directed by: Jason Winer
- Written by: Elaine Ko
- Production code: 3ARG06
- Original air date: October 12, 2011

Guest appearances
- David Cross as Duane Bailey; Samm Levine as Josh

Episode chronology
← Previous "Door to Door"	Next → "Go Bullfrogs!"
- Modern Family season 3

"Hit and Run" is the fifth episode of the third season of the American sitcom Modern Family and the series' 53rd episode overall. "Hit and Run" first aired on October 12, 2011, on ABC. The episode was written by Elaine Ko and was directed by Jason Winer. It featured guest star David Cross as Councilman Duane Bailey.

"Hit and Run" received mixed reviews from critics with Michael Arbeiter of Hollywood.com calling it "one of the least funny episodes I’ve seen in a long time". According to the Nielsen Media Research, the episode was viewed by 13.65 million viewers and received a 5.9 rating/14% share among adults between the ages of 18 and 49 and became the highest-rated scripted series of the week it aired, after Two and a Half Men.

== Plot ==
Jay (Ed O'Neill) and Manny (Rico Rodriguez) are both stressed out; Jay tries to get a new client and Manny has to write an essay for the school. Gloria (Sofía Vergara) would like to help them but no one seems to want her help despite the fact that Gloria insists that she has all the answers. Jay goes to the meeting with the potential new client, Josh (Samm Levine) but things do not go really well.

Meanwhile, Phil (Ty Burrell) and Claire (Julie Bowen) run into the town councilman Duane Bailey (David Cross), the same council man who rejected Claire's request for a stop sign in the previous episode (Door to Door). Duane is campaigning for his sixth run for town council and Phil convinces Claire that she should run too and he will take care of the kids and everything in the house.

Claire takes Phil's advice and while she is out to submit her candidacy for town council, Phil does not do really well back home; he accidentally hits Luke (Nolan Gould) while he is trying to open a band aid, gives Alex (Ariel Winter) the night medicine for her allergies that make her sleepy and Haley (Sarah Hyland) gets herself into trouble and she needs $900.

In the meantime, Mitchell (Jesse Tyler Ferguson) and Cameron (Eric Stonestreet) on their way back home from the movies, they get hit by a car at a stop sign and the other car flees. Cam maintains that they should chase him and Mitch that this was not the solution. They later ask the family what was the right thing to do and when everyone agrees with Cam, Mitch tries to convince them that violence is not the right way to sort of things, something that he insists when the men decide to go and find the person who took money from Haley. When they all get there, Mitch is the one who gets him while he is trying to escape and that way they get the money back.

== Production ==
"Hit and Run" was written by Elaine Ko and was directed by Jason Winer. This episode was Ko's second writing credit for the series after "Princess Party" and Winer's eighteenth credit for the series. The episode marked David Cross's second appearance on the series as a city councilman who becomes enemies with Claire. He previously appeared in "Door to Door" and is set to have a recurring role on the series.

== Reception ==
=== Ratings ===
In its original American broadcast, "Hit and Run" was viewed by an estimated 13.65 million households and received a 5.9 rating/14% share among adults between the ages of 18 and 49. This means that it was seen by 5.9% of all 18- to 49-year-olds, and 14% of all 18- to 49-year-olds watching television at the time of the broadcast. This marked a slight rise in the ratings from the previous episode, "Door to Door". This helped ABC win the night among adults in the 18 and 49 demographic. "Hit and Run" was the second most-watched scripted show for the week of broadcast among adults aged 18–49 and the eighth most watched show among all viewers.

=== Reviews ===
"Hit and Run" received mixed reviews from critics.

Donna Bowman of The A.V. Club gave a C+ to the episode saying that the episode didn't offer something different. "It’s okay with me if nothing different happens on Modern Family. I’ve said all along that it’s not whether the show finds any new veins of family comedy to mine; it’s how it presents those classic tropes, whether there’s a fresh take and some new character interactions to bring them to life. But aside from the evergreen entertainment value of Phil the vegetables are beginning to go rotten in the crisper drawer, and it might be time to clean out the fridge and restock."

Leigh Raines from TV Fanatic rated the episode with 4/5 stating that the little details are the ones who make the comedy perfect. "It's the little moments on the show that make me laugh, from Luke literally freezing his money, to Manny swigging his milk from a brandy glass, to the fact that Haley's voicemail would obviously be full, those little details make this comedy so perfect."

Paste writer Christine Ziemba called the episode "forced and disjointed" with the characters falling "into patterns, briefly traveling into cliche territory". She also criticized the ending to the Jay-Gloria subplot, saying it "pandered to the audience for cheap laughs". She ultimately gave the episode a 6.9/10 calling it "respectable".

Michael Arbeiter of Hollywood.com called it "one of the least funny episodes I’ve seen in a long time". Despite this, he said that "once all the plots are set up [...] and they merge into a climactic scene involving all of the adult males, things start to pick up on the funny." He continued to say that "Every beat in this scene is perfect, because the comedy and the fun derives from the closeness we feel to the family at this moment—and of course[...]We earned this moment by sticking with the family and learning about them over the past two years".
