= Treehouse (Modern Family) =

- Modern Family episode
- Cam (Eric Stonestreet) tries to pick up a woman (Leslie Mann) at the bar pretending to be straight.
- Episode no.: Season 3 Episode 7
- Directed by: Jason Winer
- Written by: Steven Levitan
- Production code: 3ARG08
- Original air date: November 2, 2011

Guest appearances
- Leslie Mann as Katie; Chazz Palminteri as Shorty; Jennifer Tilly as Darlene; Craig Zimmerman as Crispin; Kevin Hart as Andre

Episode chronology
← Previous "Go Bullfrogs!"	Next → "After the Fire"
- Modern Family season 3

"Treehouse" is the seventh episode of the third season of the American sitcom Modern Family, and the series' 55th episode overall. It aired on November 2, 2011. The episode was written by series co-creator Steven Levitan and was directed by Jason Winer. It featured guest appearances from Jennifer Tilly and Leslie Mann, and the second guest appearance of Chazz Palminteri.

== Plot ==
Phil (Ty Burrell) wants to build a treehouse for Luke (Nolan Gould) but he does not tell Claire (Julie Bowen) because he knows that she will say no. So, when he brings the supplies for it, he tells Claire that they discussed about it the previous week and they agreed. Phil starts building the treehouse with Luke's help, but Luke gives up on him after things are not going really well. Phil tries to finish the treehouse alone when his neighbor Andre (Kevin Hart) sees him and offers to help him.

Haley (Sarah Hyland) has an essay for her school with the subject "Biggest obstacle you had to overcome". She finds it difficult to find something to write about and she accuses Claire for that because they made her life easy and now she does not have anything to write about. Claire, after hearing Haley's accusations, tricks her and drives her in the middle of nowhere abandoning her with no money or phone to come back home. When she does, she tells her that she found her obstacle.

Gloria (Sofía Vergara) and Jay (Ed O'Neill) have Jay's friend Shorty (Chazz Palminteri) and his girlfriend Darlene (Jennifer Tilly) at their home for dinner. The two of them talk about romantic things they do, and Gloria does not miss the chance to say that Jay does not do anything of these things. Shorty and Darlene say they will go Salsa dancing and they invite Jay and Gloria to go with them. Gloria is excited with the idea but Jay refuses to go since he does not know how to dance.

Gloria decides to go alone with Shorty and Darlene and Jay asks Manny (Rico Rodriguez) to help him with his dancing. Mitchell (Jesse Tyler Ferguson) happens to see them while they are practicing and offers to help with his own way. He tells Jay that they are very much alike when it comes to dancing and he gives him a pill telling him that is a drug that helps him to dance when he goes to bars with Cam (Mitch later reveals that the pill was just a baby aspirin). Jay refuses to take the pill but he takes it anyway later and he surprises Gloria at the Salsa dancing club.

Meanwhile, Mitchell and Cameron (Eric Stonestreet) are at a bar with friends, and Cameron thinks that the waitress is flirting with him. Mitchell tells him that she only tries to get more tips since it is clear that Cam is obviously gay and everyone can see that. Cam is offended by that and makes a bet with Mitchell that he can get a woman's phone number at the bar. Cam approaches a woman named Katie (Leslie Mann) and manages to take her number, something that Mitchell and their friend can not believe.

Cam feels guilty that he made a woman believe he is straight and that now she'll be waiting for him to call her, so he decides to call her and tell her the truth. He calls her but instead of telling her the truth he invites her over and tries to "un-gay" the house. Katie comes and finally Cam tells her that he is gay. When she hears this, Katie is confused since she tells him that she knew, and that she just wanted a gay friend. Cam explains about the bet to her, and when Mitchell comes back home, she acts like she believed Cam was straight and she is furious because she does not want Mitchell to make fun of Cam. She leaves but before she does, she kisses Cam in front of Mitchell who is in shock.

== Production ==
"Treehouse" was written by series co-creator Steven Levitan, marking his eighth writing credit for the series. The episode was also directed by Jason Winer, his nineteenth credit for the series. The episode was filmed during the week of October 6, 2011. The episode features the second appearance of Chazz Palminteri. He previously appeared in the season one episode, "Fifteen Percent". Leslie Mann, Jennifer Tilly, and Kevin Hart also appeared in the episode. Ariel Winter and Aubrey Anderson-Emmons were absent in the episode. This is because the children are only allowed to appear in 22 episodes due to child labor laws.

== Reception ==
=== Ratings ===
In its original American broadcast, "Treehouse" was viewed by an estimated 13.37 million viewers and received a 5.7 rating/14% share among adults between the ages of 18 and 49. This means that it was seen by 5.7% of all 18- to 49-year-olds, and 14% of all 18- to 49-year-olds watching television at the time of the broadcast. The episode stayed even in the ratings from the previous episode, "Go Bullfrogs!". "Treehouse" was the most-watched scripted show for the week of broadcast among adults aged 18–49 and the thirteenth most watched show among all viewers.

=== Reviews ===
"Treehouse" received positive reviews.

Donna Bowman from The A.V. Club gave an A− rate to the episode saying: "...the reason this episodes slides into the top tier is the elegant, funny, and yes, heartwarming way the neighbor gets drawn into the family picture."

Leigh Raines from TV Fanatic gave 4.5/5 to the episode stating that "...Modern Family returned with "Treehouse" and a triple whammy of guest stars."

Christine N. Ziemba from Paste Magazine rated the episode with 8.1/10 praising the show's co-creator Steven Levitan. "Levitan wrote this week’s episode, “Treehouse,” and it showed. There were dozens of quick jokes that kept the storylines moving along, even when a few plots turned left onto predicta-ville." She closed her review saying: "So while the episode was a little uneven around the subplots, Levitan’s penchant for writing great quips—and Eric Stonestreet’s perfect delivery—made this episode of Modern Family one of the better ones of the season."
