= Door to Door (Modern Family) =

- Modern Family episode
- Jay (Ed O'Neill) and Manny (Rico Rodriguez) going door-to-door to sell wrapping paper
- Episode no.: Season 3 Episode 4
- Directed by: Chris Koch
- Written by: Bill Wrubel
- Production code: 3ARG04
- Original air date: October 5, 2011

Guest appearances
- David Cross as Duane Bailey; Jordan Feldman as Olson

Episode chronology
| ← Previous "Phil on Wire" | Next → "Hit and Run" |
- Modern Family season 3

"Door to Door" is the fourth episode of the third season of the American sitcom Modern Family, and the series' 52nd episode overall. "Door to Door" first aired on October 5, 2011, on ABC. The episode was written by Bill Wrubel and directed by Chris Koch.

== Plot ==
Claire (Julie Bowen) drives Alex (Ariel Winter) and Haley (Sarah Hyland) to school and while she does, she accidentally hits Phil (Ty Burrell) with the car. Phil gets up and continues walking saying he is OK but Claire is determined to get a stop sign at the intersection because it is dangerous not having one. She starts petitioning the city and goes door-to-door to get the signatures she needs but she does not get a very positive reaction from the neighbors. She asks for her family's help but everyone is busy with their own (meaningful) things, something that causes Claire's angry reaction.

Claire goes to the city councilman (David Cross) to discuss her proposal and everyone comes to help her after feeling guilty for not doing it from the start. Alex and Haley got the extra signatures Claire needed and Phil made a video with Luke (Nolan Gould) to prove that not having a stop sign to that intersection is dangerous.

In the meantime, Jay (Ed O'Neill) is determined to help Manny (Rico Rodriguez) sell wrapping paper for a school fundraiser and he goes door-to-door with him to teach him how to do it. Manny, however, is not a natural salesman, and after many failed tries, he manipulates Jay to buy the wrapping paper.

Meanwhile, Mitchell (Jesse Tyler Ferguson) tries to prove a point with Cameron (Eric Stonestreet). Cameron wants to cook some crepes and Mitchell tells him that he is the one who always ends up cleaning the mess in the kitchen every time Cam gets creative. Cam promises to clean up when he is done but instead of this he goes out to help Gloria (Sofía Vergara) who is desperate to find Stella (Brigitte) after losing her.

Mitchell comes back home and when he sees the mess he tells Cam that he will not clean up and let him do it as he promised. Cam comes home and sees that Mitchell indeed kept his promise not to do anything, despite hoping for the opposite, and when he starts cleaning he admits that he does not like doing it and he expected Mitch to do it. Mitch is happy that he was proved right and the two of them revel in further mess-making until the doorbell rings and reveals a representative from the adoption agency coming for a home-visit.

== Production ==
"Door to Door" was written by executive producer Bill Wrubel and was directed by Chris Koch. "Door to Door" was filmed between August 29 and September 1, 2011. The episode marked the first appearance of David Cross as a city councilman who becomes enemies with Claire. He will appear in a recurring role.

== Reception ==
=== Ratings ===
In its original American broadcast, "Door to Door" was viewed by an estimated 13.24 million households and received a 5.7 rating/15% share among adults between the ages of 18 and 49.

This means that it was seen by 5.7% of all 18- to 49-year-olds, and 15% of all 18- to 49-year-olds watching television at the time of the broadcast. The episode stayed even in the ratings compared to the previous episode, "Phil on Wire". The episode also ranked first in its timeslot, beating the Fox reality series, The X Factor, CBS drama series Criminal Minds, NBC drama series Harry's Law and The CW reality series, America's Next Top Model.

=== Reviews ===
"Door to Door" received positive reviews from critics.

The A.V. Club reviewer Donna Bowman gave the episode a positive review and specifically praised the montage of the family members going door to door writing that "This montage wasn’t the reason for the episode; it was a way to add a little value, a bit of virtuoso flourish, to an episode whose elements were solid but generally not original. And that’s why I continue to appreciate this show". She concluded that "At this point, with characters capable of memorable moments just about any week, we should expect the home runs but appreciate the frequency of extra-base hits". She ultimately gave the episode a B+.

Sandra Gonzalez of Entertainment Weekly praised Ty Burrell's performance writing that "His lines and delivery have been incredible this season, and the cherry on top of this sundae of hilarity was seeing Phil and Luke answer the door without pants".

Christine Ziemba of Paste praised the episode calling it superior compared to the previous episode. She also called the dialogue "top notch" and praised the cast for delivering "perfect punchlines". She ultimately gave the episode a 9.2/10 calling it "phenomenal".

CNN writer Henry Hanks praised Ed O'Neill's performance in the episode calling it "another Emmy-worthy performance".

Maris Kreizman of New York praised Ty Burrell's performance writing that "he can create funny little moments out of the most throwaway of lines".
