= Go Bullfrogs! =

- Modern Family episode
- Episode no.: Season 3 Episode 6
- Directed by: Scott Ellis
- Written by: Abraham Higginbotham
- Production code: 3ARG07
- Original air date: October 19, 2011

Guest appearances
- Gilles Marini as Julian; Kevin Daniels as Longines; Andrea Savage as Holly; Artemis Pebdani as Bethenny; Jordan Nichols as Ben Ford; Trisha Paytas as Plastic Surgery Girl

Episode chronology
← Previous "Hit and Run"	Next → "Treehouse"
- Modern Family season 3

"Go Bullfrogs!" is the sixth episode of the third season of the American sitcom Modern Family, and the series' 54th episode overall. "Go Bullfrogs!" first aired on October 19, 2011, on ABC. The episode was written by Abraham Higginbotham and was directed by Scott Ellis. It featured guest star Gilles Marini as Julian.

== Plot ==
Phil Dunphy (Ty Burrell) takes Haley (Sarah Hyland) to his alma mater to show her what college is like, a visit he clearly enjoys for the nostalgia. Haley is glad to spend the time with her father, but a little embarrassed by his eagerness to relive his own college days. Meanwhile, his wife Claire (Julie Bowen) savors the prospect of a night out on her own, since their other two children are at sleepovers with their friends. After dropping Luke (Nolan Gould) off at his friend's house, she turns down an invitation from the host's mother to watch Gone with the Wind with the other mothers, falsely claiming to be sick and having seen it multiple times (when she hasn't in fact seen it at all).

Phil lets Haley accept an invitation to a party and while he plays darts with the young men in the bar he was eating at with Haley, he finds out from her cellphone tracker that Haley is apparently at a frat party. Worrying about what might happen, he leaves in a hurry. Phil runs into the party and tears Haley away from a young man she's talking to, only to learn he's someone he once coached in whiffle ball, and his parents are nearby.

Jay (Ed O'Neill) settles down reluctantly to watch a telenovela with Gloria (Sofía Vergara), when Manny (Rico Rodriguez) takes delivery of a package and quickly runs upstairs to his room without explaining what it is. Jay begins to get absorbed in the telenovela, while Gloria begins to worry about what Manny's package might be. She is offended by Jay's suggestion that it might be pornography, and eventually she is so upset that she decides to go for a walk.

Gloria returns and finds Jay on the phone with their housekeeper getting backstory on the telenovela. At that moment, Manny cries out for help from upstairs, saying he is stuck. Gloria, now prepared to concede Jay might have been right, joins her husband as they go to his room and find him hanging upside down in his closet door wearing a weighted helmet ... apparently his package was a device to make him taller. Manny tells Gloria and Jay that he bought the device because a girl he was interested in liked taller boys. Gloria reassures him he will have a lot to offer any young woman no matter how tall he is.

Claire joins Mitchell (Jesse Tyler Ferguson) and Cameron (Eric Stonestreet) for their night out. She is quickly bored with the restaurant they attend, and persuades them to take her to a boutique opening instead. At the boutique opening she meets Cameron and Mitchell's friends and she eventually decides to leave with Julian (Gilles Marini) who came to the party with Cameron and Mitchell's friend Longinus (Kevin Daniels) because Cameron and Mitchell want to get back early to attend Lily (Aubrey Anderson-Emmons).

On their way home, Cameron and Mitchell ponder whether Claire was right when she said they had become boring, a consideration that deepens when they discover that the valet gave them keys to the wrong car and that the owners of that car apparently leads an interesting life despite apparently having a young child as well. They decide to use the GPS in the car to return it to its proper owners. Upon their return, the owner's wife starts attacking the car, and they are trapped inside as they cannot get it out of the driveway.

At the end of the episode, Claire, in response to a call from Luke for his retainer, goes back to the sleepover, only to be caught in her lies by the other mothers, and discover that Julian is straight and not gay as she thought; Phil explains to Haley that he still wants to protect her, and will not have much more time to enjoy that aspect of being her father; Mitchell and Cameron return home in the badly dented car, met by the owner, who says he can see they have met his wife.

== Production ==
"Go Bullfrogs!" was written by Abraham Higginbotham and was directed by Scott Ellis. The episode was filmed between September 27 and October 7, 2011. The Haley-Phil plot was originally reported by TV Guide writer William Keck. Ariel Winter and Aubrey Anderson-Emmons are absent from the episode due to the fact that the kids are only required to appear in 22 episodes a season.

== Reception ==
=== Ratings ===
In its original American broadcast, "Go Bullfrogs!" was viewed by an estimated 13.04 million viewers and received a 5.7 rating/14% share among adults between the ages of 18 and 49. This means that it was seen by 5.7% of all 18- to 49-year-olds, and 14% of all 18- to 49-year-olds watching television at the time of the broadcast. This marked a three-tenths drop in the ratings from the previous episode, "Hit and Run. Despite this, the episode ranked as the highest-rated show on Wednesday. "Hit and Run" was the most-watched show for the week of broadcast among adults aged 18–49, beating Sunday Night Football. The episode also ranked as the twelfth most watched show among all viewers.

=== Reviews ===
"Go Bullfrogs!" received generally positive reviews reviews. Leigh Raines from TV Fanatic rated the episode with 4.5/5 saying that overall was a great episode.

Donna Bowman of The A.V. Club gave a B− to the episode stating that she believes "the best episodes of the show are the ones that allow the ensemble as a whole to generate the laughs [...] “Go Bullfrogs!” is really the exact opposite, and predictably, despite some marvelous writing and performing, it doesn't really feel like a Modern Family episode, at least not the kind I like best." She closed her review saying: "Last week, I thought the situations were promising, but the writing let them down. This week we have some sharp writing in situations that were generally limp and uninspired. At some point, I assume the two sides of this show are going to get together and make some comedy again."

Christine N. Ziemba from Paste Magazine gave the episode 7/10 saying that Phil Dunphy once again saved the day in this week's "middle-of-the-road Modern Family episode."

=== Awards ===
Julie Bowen submitted this episode and won the Primetime Emmy Award for Outstanding Supporting Actress in a Comedy Series at the 64th Primetime Emmy Awards in 2012.
