= After the Fire (Modern Family) =

- Modern Family episode
- Cam (Eric Stonestreet) tries to drive a huge moving truck to prove Haley (Sarah Hyland) and Alex (Ariel Winter) that gay men can drive trucks
- Episode no.: Season 3 Episode 8
- Directed by: Fred Savage
- Written by: Danny Zuker
- Production code: 3ARG09
- Original air date: November 16, 2011

Episode chronology
← Previous "Treehouse"	Next → "Punkin Chunkin"
- Modern Family season 3

"After the Fire" is the eighth episode of the third season of the American sitcom Modern Family, and the series' 56th episode. It aired on November 16, 2011. The episode was written by Danny Zuker and was directed by Fred Savage. The episode chronicles the family's misadventures while trying to do good deeds.

== Plot ==
After a neighbor's home burns down, the whole family rallies and organizes a community drive to help do some good. But things do not seem to be going well for them.

Jay (Ed O'Neill) throws his back while he is trying to carry a box. Phil (Ty Burrell) is offering to massage him to make him feel better. During the massage though, Jay tells Phil that he loves him but he regrets it right away. Phil rushes out the room and Jay does not know what to do to "fix" what he did. Later it is revealed that Phil did not even hear what Jay told him, since at that moment he got a very important message on his phone about his work and was not listening to Jay. When Jay goes to talk to Phil, he is relieved to realise Phil didn't hear him. Phil explains that he has been offered a partnership in a new real estate firm and isn't sure if he wants to take a risk by quitting his stable job to join. Jay encourages Phil to take the partnership, assuring him he has all the skills he needs to succeed.

Cameron (Eric Stonestreet) is doing some posturing with a huge moving truck while he is trying to prove Haley (Sarah Hyland) and Alex (Ariel Winter) that gays can drive a truck after they said that he couldn't drive a truck. The only thing he manages to do though is to hit other cars and gets them trapped in the truck before they ask someone for help. It is then revealed that the girls' remarks were due to Cam's incompetence in driving, not because of his sexuality.

Claire (Julie Bowen) discovers that Mitchell (Jesse Tyler Ferguson) spends a lot of time with Gloria (Sofía Vergara) and she accuses him that he is turning Gloria into mom. Mitchell tries to convince her that she is wrong about it with not much success. When Claire goes to complain to Jay, she realises that she doing the same as she did as a child and realises that she (Claire) is the one comparing Gloria to their mom.

Meanwhile, Luke (Nolan Gould) and Manny (Rico Rodriguez) get their hands on a helicopter toy that was donated; though Manny couldn't steer the toy and the heli got away. A group of teenagers get hold of the toy and refuses to return it to them. At the same time, Cam and the girls are driving back to the house and meet Manny and Luke there; it turns out the teens look up to Alex, and they managed to get the toy back before Gloria realizes it's missing.

== Reception ==
=== Ratings ===
In its original American broadcast, "After the Fire" was watched by 12.91 million; slightly down from the last original episode.

=== Reviews ===
"After the Fire" received generally positive reviews.

Christine N. Ziemba from Paste Magazine rated the episode with 8/10 saying that there were moments of surprising absurdity, something that is welcomed, in the episode. "For the first time in a while, there were genuinely touching moments in at the end of Modern Family. These moments didn’t feel forced, so kudos to the cast for knowing when to hold back on the humor—a mark of a great sitcom."

RyanTalksTV.com said that the episode was very good. "Actually, I’d go as far as saying it was pretty damn close to perfect. Every story tied in very well with one another, and let’s be honest… you can’t go wrong pairing Jay and Phil or Luke and Manny!"

Leigh Raines of TV Fanatic gave a 4/5 grade.

Contrariwise, Donna Bowman of The A.V. Club gave a C grade to the episode saying that it's not always a good idea to put all the characters together. "Tonight’s episode is proof that getting the whole ensemble together isn’t always the best idea."
