= Lindsey Alvarez =

American sound engineer

- Born: Houston, Texas, U.S.
- Occupation: Sound engineer

Lindsey Alvarez is an American sound engineer.

Alvarez was born in Houston, Texas. She won a Primetime Emmy Award in the category Outstanding Sound Mixing for her work on the television program Only Murders in the Building. Her win was shared with Alan DeMoss, Mathew Waters and Joseph White Jr.
