= Mathew Waters (sound engineer) =

American sound engineer

- Occupation: Sound engineer

Mathew Waters is an American sound engineer. He has won seven Primetime Emmy Awards and has been nominated for four more in the category Outstanding Sound Mixing. In 2022, Waters won a Primetime Emmy Award for his work on the television program Only Murders in the Building, sharing the win with Lindsey Alvarez, Alan DeMoss and Joseph White Jr.
