= Dude Ranch (Modern Family) =

- Modern Family episode
- Episode no.: Season 3 Episode 1
- Directed by: Jason Winer
- Written by: Paul Corrigan; Brad Walsh; Dan O'Shannon
- Production code: 3ARG03
- Original air date: September 21, 2011

Guest appearances
- Tim Blake Nelson as Hank; Reid Ewing as Dylan

Episode chronology
← Previous "The One That Got Away"	Next → "When Good Kids Go Bad"
- Modern Family season 3

"Dude Ranch" is the third season premiere of the American sitcom Modern Family and the 49th episode overall. The episode originally aired on September 21, 2011, on American Broadcasting Company (ABC) and ran back-to-back with "When Good Kids Go Bad". The episode was written by Paul Corrigan, Brad Walsh & Dan O'Shannon and directed by Jason Winer.

"Dude Ranch" features guest stars Tim Blake Nelson as Hank and Reid Ewing as Dylan. Serving as the first part of the one-hour season premiere, the episode revolves around the three families traveling to a dude ranch.

"Dude Ranch" received positive reviews from critics with many praising Nolan Gould's performance as Luke Dunphy, with Alan Sepinwall calling him the MVP of the episode. The episode was viewed by more than 14.54 million viewers and received a 6.1 rating/15% share among adults between the ages of 18 and 49, marking an 18-percent rise from the second season premiere, "The Old Wagon". The episode also became the highest-rated and most viewed episode of the series. It also ranked as the highest-rated ABC series for the week of broadcast and fourth overall.

This episode won a Primetime Emmy Award for Outstanding Sound Mixing for a Comedy or Drama Series (Half-Hour) and Animation. Season one episode "En Garde" won the same award back in 2010.

== Plot ==
The three families travel to a dude ranch in Wyoming. In the Pritchett family storyline, Gloria (Sofía Vergara) experiences hearing difficulty following the plane ride while a cowboy, Hank (Tim Blake Nelson), flirts with her. Gloria's husband, Jay (Ed O'Neill), takes notice, but Gloria is oblivious to his behavior. Later, Hank grabs Gloria's butt causing Jay to tell him to back off, which he does. He said if it were not for him being the bad guy Jay would not have been a hero, but Gloria fights back and says Jay is always a hero.

Meanwhile, in the Dunphy family, Dylan (Reid Ewing), Haley's boyfriend, tags along on the trip, much to Claire's chagrin. However, Phil (Ty Burrell) eventually convinces her that she should try to get to know Dylan. She attempts to, but suddenly Dylan proposes to Haley (Sarah Hyland) around the campfire one night. This causes Claire (Julie Bowen) to instantly say no for Haley, leading to Dylan running away. The families go off and look for him, during which Haley criticizes Claire for interfering and reveals she would not have accepted Dylan's proposal. It is also revealed that Dylan gets a job at the ranch and decides to permanently stay in Wyoming, breaking up with Haley.

During the trip, a teenage boy named Jimmy (Matthew Gumley) flirts with Alex (Ariel Winter) and later kisses her. In addition, Phil attempts to impress Jay and prove he has earned Jay's respect, and Jay eventually tells Phil that he does truly respect Phil.

Cameron (Eric Stonestreet) and Mitchell (Jesse Tyler Ferguson) reveal that they are adopting a boy from the United States. Mitchell worries that he will not be able to do all the father/son things because of his sexuality and his inability to participate in "manly" activities such as catching and shooting. Despite this, he reassures himself after he blows up a birdhouse with a firecracker with Luke (Nolan Gould).

== Production and themes ==
"Dude Ranch" was written by Paul Corrigan, Brad Walsh & Dan O'Shannon. The episode was directed by Jason Winer, his first director's credit since the first season. It aired on September 21, 2011, back-to-back with the "When Good Kids Go Bad". "Dude Ranch" was filmed between August 17 and August 19, 2011, on location in Jackson Hole, Wyoming. Other cities that were under consideration were Tucson, Arizona and Bozeman, Montana. Tim Blake Nelson guest starred in the episode as a cowboy who "intimidates the guys and sends the girls' hearts a-twitter". Reid Ewing returned as Dylan, in his final appearance for the series until he reappeared in the episode entitled "Disneyland."

Near the end of the second season, there were rumors alluding to the producers recasting the role of Lily, and changing her age from a baby to a toddler. In July 2011, a casting call for a "3- to 4-year-old daughter of Mitchell and Cameron" was put out by the producers. Co-creator and executive producer Steven Levitan stated that:

"It was a hard decision, and this was not remotely having to do with us wanting to upgrade the acting ability or jump the character in age. The twins who play the part (Jaden and Ella Hiller) were not happy. We started feeling like we were just being mean to these little girls, making them come to the stage. And the character is reaching an age where she would talk, and that was going to be an asset to us to have Cam and Mitch communicating with her."

They eventually cast Aubrey Anderson-Emmons to play the toddler-aged, Lily, replacing twin sisters, Jayden and Ella Hiller. The episode also features the addition of two new writers, Ben Karlin as a consulting producer and Cindy Chupack as co-executive producer.

The episode mainly deals with the male characters in the show and "the flaws and foibles of the menfolk", hence the episode title, "Dude Ranch". Mitchell deals with being not manly enough to raise a boy while Jay deals with the cowboy flirting with Gloria. Phil attempts to gain Jay's respect, a recurring theme in several other episodes. Eventually, all the characters gain their confidence with Mitchell blowing up a birdhouse with Luke, Jay standing up to the cowboy and Phil standing up to Jay.

== Reception ==
=== Ratings ===
In its original American broadcast, "Dude Ranch" alongside the following episode, "When Good Kids Go Bad", was viewed by an estimated 14.54 million households and received a 6.1 rating/15% share among adults between the ages of 18 and 49. This means that it was seen by 6.1% of all 18- to 49-year-olds, and 15% of all 18- to 49-year-olds watching television at the time of the broadcast. This marked an 18% rise in the ratings from the second season premiere, "The Old Wagon", making it the highest-rated and most-viewed episode of the series and became ABC's top-rated season premiere in six years. The episode also ranked first in its timeslot, beating the highly promoted new Fox reality series The X Factor, CBS drama series Criminal Minds, NBC drama series Harry's Law and CW reality series, America's Next Top Model. Added with DVR viewers, who viewed the episode within three days of the original broadcast, the episode received a 7.7 rating in the 18–49 demographic, adding a 1.7 rating to the original viewership. "Dude Ranch" was the third most-watched scripted show for the week of broadcast among adults aged 18–49 and the eleventh most watched show among all viewers.

=== Reviews ===
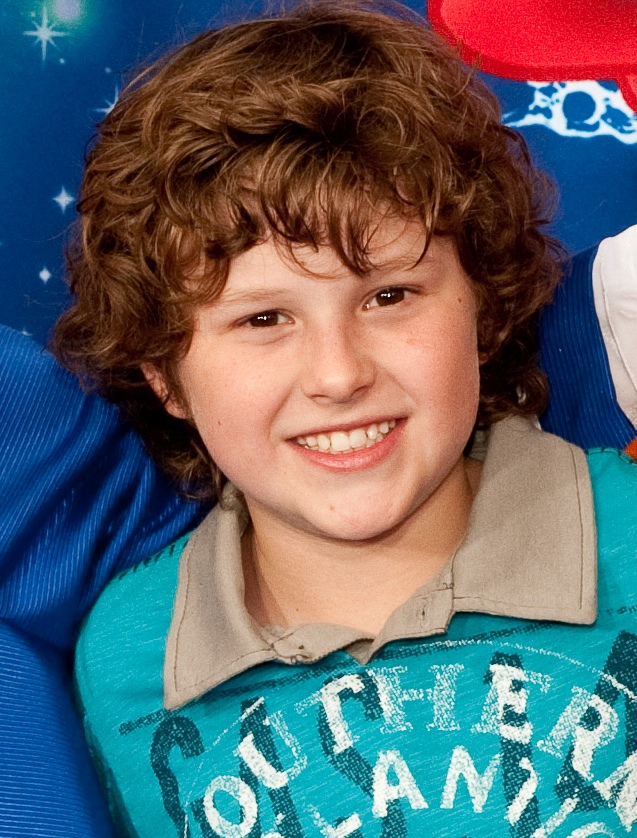
Nolan Gould's performance was praised by critics.

The episode received positive reviews from critics.

Maris Kreizman of New York called the episode "not all that surprising and a little sentimental, but charming nonetheless." She also complimented the development of Alex's character commenting that it "was nice to see a bit of real character development for Alex.".

The A.V. Club reviewer Donna Bowman compared the episode to the second season episode "Halloween" for its use of the whole ensemble, and ultimately gave the episode a B+.

HitFix reviewer Alan Sepinwall felt that "Dude Ranch" was the weaker episode of the hour, and commented that "Sitcom vacation episodes, as a rule, tend to not be very good. There have been exceptions[...]"Dude Ranch" was unfortunately not one of them. Despite this, he complimented the subplots for the kids, but criticized the plots for the adults calling them "much less memorable".

Entertainment Weekly writer Sandra Gonzalez praised the episode, saying it proved the show deserved the second Emmy Award for Outstanding Comedy Series. Despite her mainly positive review, she criticized the Gloria storyline, writing that she "wish she [Sofia Vergara] had more to do than scream the entire episode".

Henry Hanks of CNN said the episode was equal in quality to the first-season episode, "Hawaii" saying that the episode "[showed] once again why it's one of the most consistently funny shows on TV. He also noted that his favorite moment "had to be Jay's struggles with the horse" and called Jay the MVP of the episode, saying Ed O'Neill deserved to win the Emmy over Ty Burrell.

Paste writer Christina Ziemba said that the episode proved that the series deserved to win at the Emmy's saying it was "rife with great gags, jokes and one-liners". She ultimately gave this episode and "When Good Kids Go Bad" an 8.5/10 calling it "commendable".

Zac Oldenburg of Television Blend criticized the Phil-Jay subplot for repeating ideas. He eventually called the episode a "rough start" and considered it worse than the following episode.

Multiple critics praised Nolan Gould's performance in the episode, as Luke. Sepinwall called him the MVP of the episode. Other critics also called the episode superior to the second half-hour, "When Good Kids Go Bad".
