= List of Modern Family characters =

List of characters appearing in the TV series Modern Family

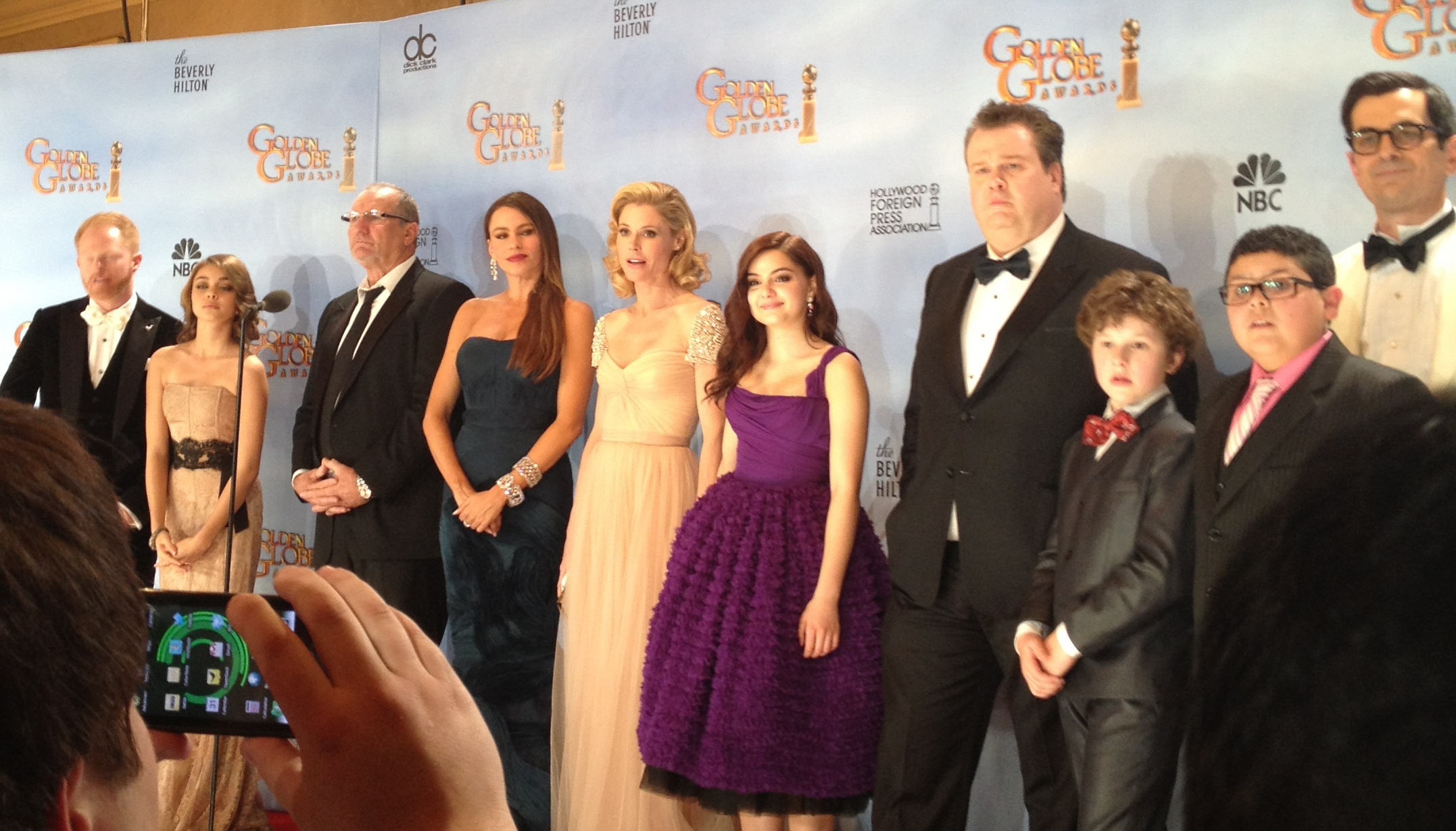
Cast of Modern Family at the 69th Golden Globe Awards in 2012

Modern Family is an American TV comedy series revolving around three families interrelated through Jay Pritchett, his son Mitchell Pritchett, and his daughter Claire Dunphy. The families meet for family functions (usually around their three neighborhoods or while traveling during vacations) and cross-family bonding.

== Main cast ==
Modern Family cast and characters
Actor	Character	Season										
Actor	Character	1	2	3	4	5	6	7	8	9	10	11
Ed O'Neill	Jay Pritchett	Main	Main	Main	Main	Main	Main	Main	Main	Main	Main	Main
Sofía Vergara	Gloria Delgado-Pritchett	Main	Main	Main	Main	Main	Main	Main	Main	Main	Main	Main
Julie Bowen	Claire Dunphy	Main	Main	Main	Main	Main	Main	Main	Main	Main	Main	Main
Ty Burrell	Phil Dunphy	Main	Main	Main	Main	Main	Main	Main	Main	Main	Main	Main
Jesse Tyler Ferguson	Mitchell Pritchett	Main	Main	Main	Main	Main	Main	Main	Main	Main	Main	Main
Eric Stonestreet	Cameron Tucker	Main	Main	Main	Main	Main	Main	Main	Main	Main	Main	Main
Sarah Hyland	Haley Dunphy	Main	Main	Main	Main	Main	Main	Main	Main	Main	Main	Main
Ariel Winter	Alex Dunphy	Main	Main	Main	Main	Main	Main	Main	Main	Main	Main	Main
Nolan Gould	Luke Dunphy	Main	Main	Main	Main	Main	Main	Main	Main	Main	Main	Main
Rico Rodriguez	Manny Delgado	Main	Main	Main	Main	Main	Main	Main	Main	Main	Main	Main
Aubrey Anderson-Emmons	Lily Tucker-Pritchett	Recurring (Note: Portrayed by Jaden Hiller and Ella Hiller)	Recurring	Main	Main	Main	Main	Main	Main	Main	Main	Main
Jeremy Maguire	Joe Pritchett				Recurring (Note: Portrayed by Pierce Wallace)	Recurring	Recurring	Main	Main	Main	Main	Main
Reid Ewing	Dylan Marshall	Recurring	Recurring	Recurring	Recurring	Recurring	Guest	Recurring	Guest	Guest	Recurring	Main

== The Dunphy family ==
=== Phil Dunphy ===
Phil Dunphy
- First appearance: "Pilot"; 1x01, September 23, 2009
- Last appearance: "Finale"; 11x17 & 11x18, April 8, 2020
- Portrayed by: Ty Burrell

In-universe information
- Full name: Philip Humphrey Dunphy
- Aliases: Clive Bixby; Jebediah Dunphy
- Gender: Male
- Occupation: Realtor and magic store owner
- Family: Frank Dunphy (father; deceased); Grace Dunphy (mother; deceased); Lorraine Dunphy (stepmother); Ray (stepbrother)
- Spouse: Claire Pritchett (m. 1993)
- Significant others: Carla Concannon (Ex-Girlfriend); Denise (Ex-Girlfriend)
- Children: Haley Dunphy (daughter); Alex Dunphy (daughter); Luke Dunphy (son)
- Relatives: George Marshall (grandson); Poppy Marshall (granddaughter); Dylan Marshall (son-in-law); Jay Pritchett (father-in-law); DeDe Williams (mother-in-law; deceased); Gloria Delgado-Pritchett (stepmother-in-law); Mitchell Pritchett (brother-in-law); Joe Pritchett (half brother-in-law); Manny Delgado (stepbrother-in-law); Cameron Tucker (brother-in-law); Lily Tucker-Pritchett (adoptive niece by marriage); Rexford Tucker-Pritchett (adoptive nephew by marriage)

Philip Humphrey "Phil" Dunphy (Ty Burrell) is Claire's husband of 15 years who sees himself as the "cool dad". He dotes on his wife Claire and constantly tries to find ways to bond with his three kids. He is seen as very competitive, one example being his always beating his son in various sports or other competitions. He has a very juvenile attitude and is referred to by Claire as the "kid [she's] married to". He uses a parenting method that he calls "peerenting", which is a combination of talking like a peer but acting like a parent.

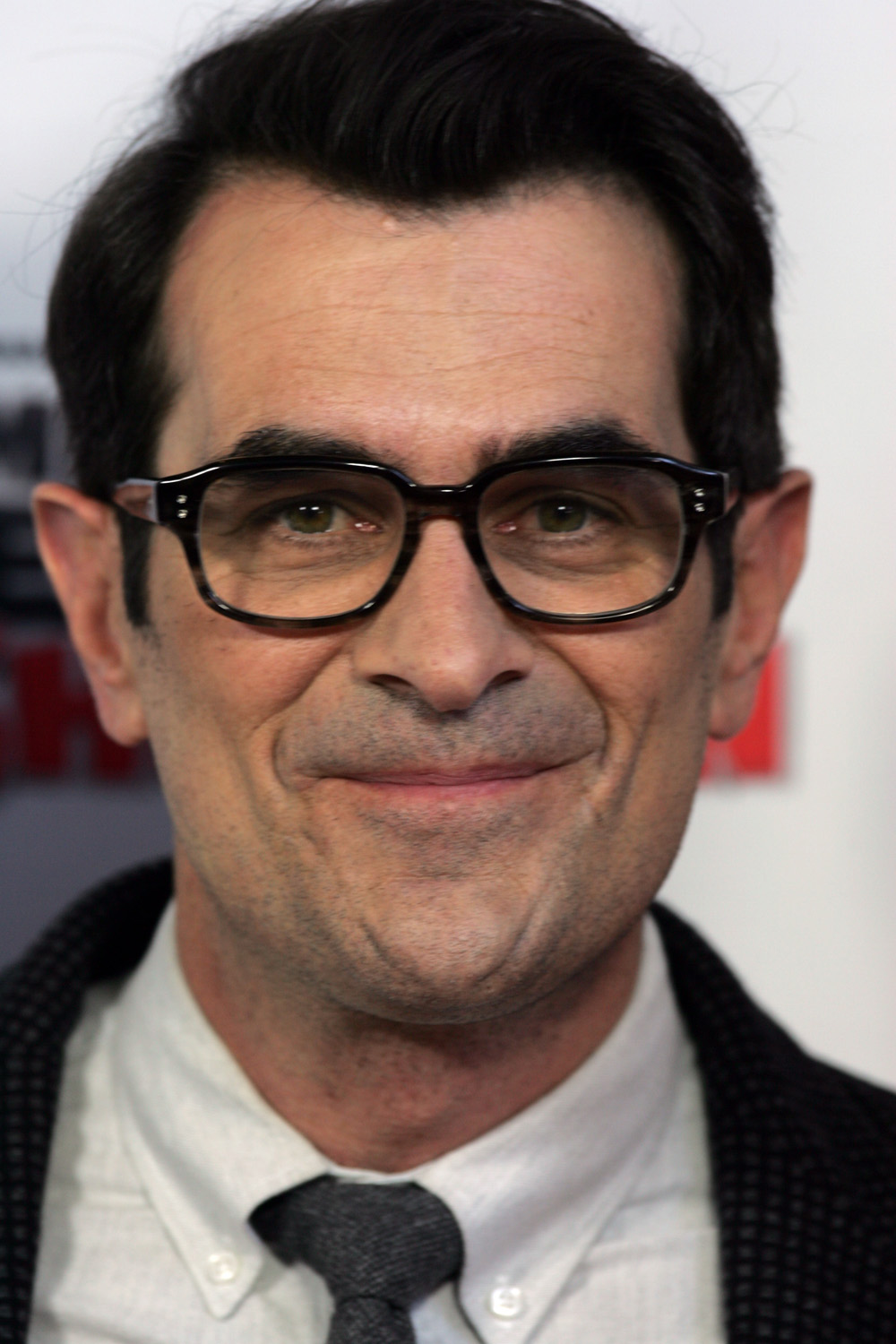
Ty Burrell portrayed Phil Dunphy, the father of three children and Claire's husband.

Phil is a realtor who is very confident in his work, once saying, "I could sell a fur coat to an Eskimo." Phil has a severe case of coulrophobia, which is first revealed when despite Mitchell's objection, Cameron comes to Luke's party dressed as a clown. This may stem from Phil's having found a dead clown in the woods when he was a child. Phil once dresses up as a clown for a kids' party but has a panic attack when he catches his reflection in multiple mirrors. Phil appears to love home repair yet never seems to get around to any of the jobs requested by Claire. Throughout season 1, his ongoing project is fixing the step. He at times shows a sort of crush-like affection for Gloria. However, he says he "would never stray from Claire," although Gloria did kiss him during a "kiss cam" segment at a basketball game in the final episode of season 1, "Family Portrait", however he was immediately regretful for not preventing it as he didn't want to do it. In college, he was a cheerleader at Fresno State and his birthday is on April 3.

Phil seems oblivious as to what he says by miscalculating (if at all) the consequences of his expressions, such as "Phil Dunphy is no straight guy" (when he is referring to not being a straight man) or "If you ain't white, you ain't right" (referring to the t-shirt color of a team that he was playing on). He often seeks approval from Jay, who generally does not openly show approval of anyone. In the Season 3 episode "Dude Ranch," Phil shows considerable skill both on horseback and with a shotgun, notably shooting two clay pigeons on one foot.

In moments of acute adversity or shock in which most people would curse or swear, Phil utters humorous exclamations: references to food such as, "Sweet Potato Fries!" or "Chicken in a basket!", etc. or he might make a historical reference such as "John Philip Sousa!" It is revealed in "Tableau Vivant" that Phil had once tried to break up with Claire but didn't dare to do so.

A running gag in the show has Phil running up the stairs (often when carrying an object) and tripping on a loose step, causing him to say some variation of "Gotta fix that step!"

==== Critical reception ====
Ty Burrell had received many positive reviews for his performance. Hank Stuever from The Washington Post wrote, "A standout performance from Ty Burrell's new twist on the doofus-dad stereotype." Paige Wiser, a reporter for the Chicago Sun Times, wrote, "Ty Burrell is a genius as a dad who stays hip by keeping up with the numbers from High School Musical." Robert Canning of IGN in a review of the season loved Ty Burrell's performance of Phil Dunphy and named him one of two characters that stood out to him saying "actor Ty Burrell owned this part, and his well-intended faux pas throughout the season were stellar."

==== Accolades ====
In 2010, Ty Burrell received a nomination for the Television Critics Association Award for Individual Achievement in Comedy, winning in 2011. In 2011 and 2014, Burrell won the Primetime Emmy Award for Outstanding Supporting Actor in a Comedy Series, also receiving nominations in 2010, 2012, and 2013. In 2012, Burrell won the Critics' Choice Television Award for Best Supporting Actor in a Comedy Series. In 2014, Burrell won the Screen Actors Guild Award for Outstanding Performance by a Male Actor in a Comedy Series, receiving nominations in 2011, 2012, 2013, 2015, and 2016. In 2010 and 2011, Burrell was nominated for the Satellite Award for Best Supporting Actor – Series, Miniseries or Television Film.

==== Other appearances ====
On May 4, 2016, Burrell appeared in character as Phil in the first commercials for the National Association of Realtors talking about his "Phil's-osophies". Arnold Worldwide executive creative director Sean McBride said Phil was written as a Realtor on his show and "embodies many of the attributes that are important in a Realtor: He's honest, he's helpful, he's sincere."

=== Claire Dunphy ===
Claire Dunphy
- First appearance: "Pilot"; 1x01, September 23, 2009
- Last appearance: "Finale"; 11x17 & 11x18, April 8, 2020
- Portrayed by: Julie Bowen; Zoe Noelle, Avery Tiiu Essex (young)

In-universe information
- Full name: Claire Pritchett Dunphy
- Alias: Juliana
- Gender: Female
- Occupation: Senior VP of Organize 'Em; President of Pritchett Closets and Blinds (formerly); Housewife (formerly)
- Family: Jay Pritchett (father); DeDe Williams (mother; deceased); Gloria Delgado-Pritchett (stepmother); Mitchell Pritchett (brother); Joe Pritchett (half brother); Manny Delgado (stepbrother)
- Spouse: Phil Dunphy (m. 1993)
- Significant others: Robbie Sullivan (Ex-Boyfriend); Ricky (Ex-Boyfriend)
- Children: Haley Dunphy (daughter); Alex Dunphy (daughter); Luke Dunphy (son)
- Relatives: George Marshall (grandson); Poppy Marshall (granddaughter); Dylan Marshall (son-in-law); Lucas Pritchett (grandfather; deceased); Donnie Pritchett (uncle); Irene Pritchett (aunt); Becky Pritchett (aunt); Melissa Pritchett (grand-cousin); BeBe Williams (aunt); CeCe Williams (aunt); Lily Tucker-Pritchett (adoptive niece); Rexford Tucker-Pritchett (adoptive nephew); Cameron Tucker (brother-in-law); Frank Dunphy (father-in-law, deceased); Grace Dunphy (mother-in-law; deceased); Lorraine Dunphy (step-mother-in-law); Ray (step-brother-in-law)

Claire Dunphy (Julie Bowen), née Pritchett, is the daughter of Jay, Mitchell's older sister, and is married to Phil Dunphy. She is the helicopter soccer mom of the Dunphy family and its three very different kids. She was once a wild child who made a great deal of mistakes over the years, and she is fearful that her children could make the same mistakes, especially her oldest daughter, Haley. She is often exhausted from the stress created by her family but is still a loving mother. When it comes to her kids, she has difficulty controlling Haley's independence and irresponsibility, Alex's sarcasm and perfectionism, and Luke's lack of common sense. She also gets annoyed with her husband, Phil, constantly.

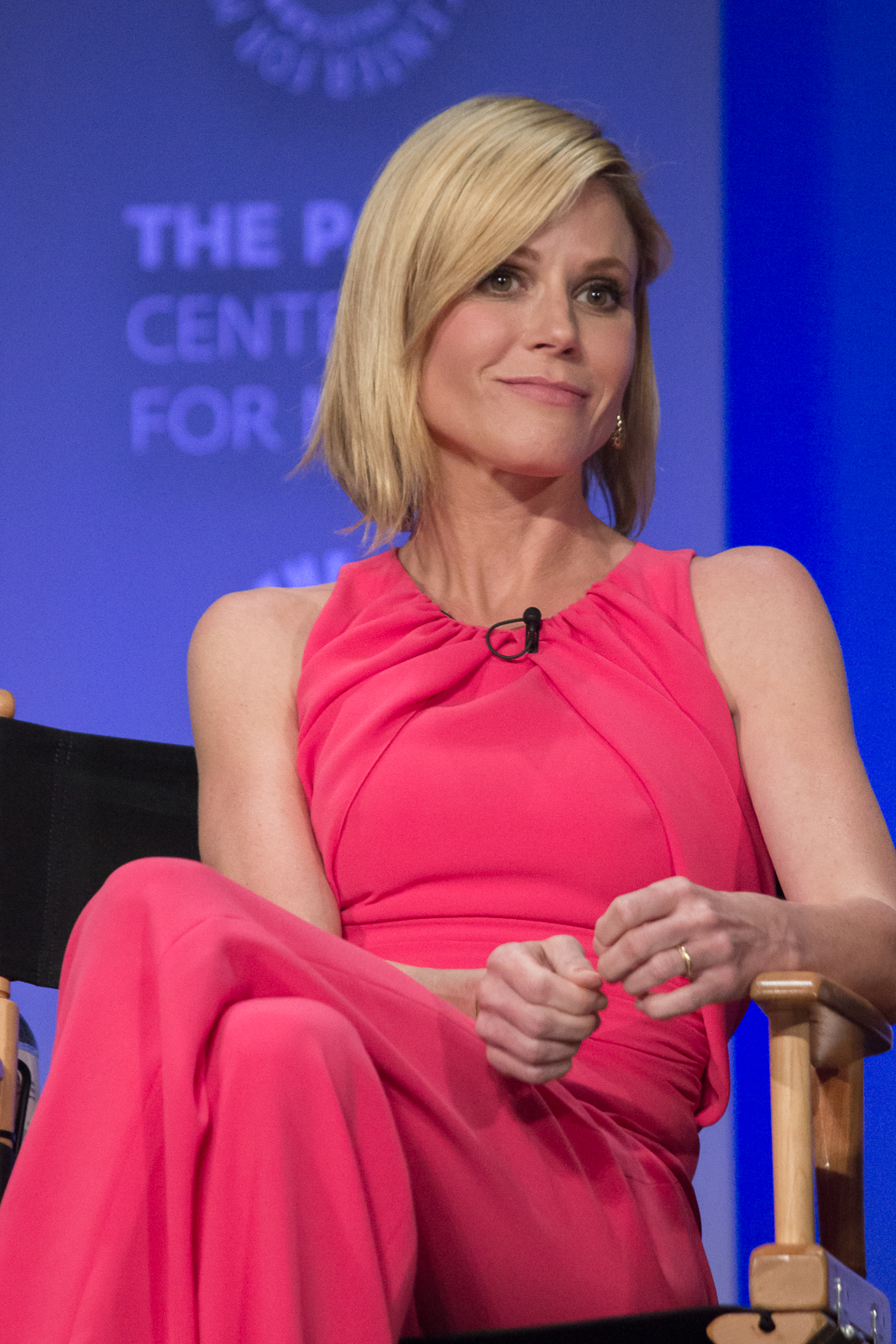
Julie Bowen portrayed Claire Dunphy, the mother of three and Phil's wife.

Claire is very competitive, especially in her obsession with being right, and has a brittle personality that causes her to get angry, paranoid, and freak out easily. She is very strict about a clean house. She is seen as an experienced parent by Cameron and Mitchell, so she is called upon for her parenting advice. She enjoys running and reading. She could also come across as uptight or arrogant at times, especially during her scenes with Gloria. She is also very attached to Halloween and describes it as her "crazy lady holiday". In the episode "Open House of Horrors," it is revealed that the neighbors are frightened of Claire's very graphic and realistic decorations around the house. Claire is also the most active family member when organizing family get-togethers. When a former co-worker (Minnie Driver) visits, it is revealed that Claire had a successful job in hospitality management but left her job and married Phil a few months after she became pregnant with Haley. She shows resentment towards the abandonment of her working career due to seeing one of her former peers' success but later realizes her family is more important.

Claire is a perfectionist; according to Phil, "when everybody else sees something beautiful, all she sees is the teeny-tiny flaw." She is also terrible at giving gifts. As her husband Phil once bought her a bracelet for their anniversary, she made him coupons for five free hugs, which she was very proud of.

Her step-brother is Manny Delgado. Claire received another sibling through Jay's second wife, Gloria: Fulgencio "Joe". She often despises the attention that Gloria gets for her voluptuous figure and is thrilled to learn that Gloria was pregnant because of all the weight that Gloria would be gaining. However, she generally has a good relationship with Gloria, with them sometimes doing yoga or spa days together.

==== Critical reception ====
Julie Bowen's performance was praised by Ken Tucker of Entertainment Weekly who said, "Bowen's Claire could have been a blank blonde cipher. Far from it: Bowen's wide array of silent gazes at the camera, her slow-burns at her clan's bad behavior, and her ability to freak out without seeming nutso crazy makes her an essential, stand-out part of TV's best freshman ensemble cast."

==== Accolades ====
In 2011 and 2012, Julie Bowen won the Primetime Emmy Award for Outstanding Supporting Actress in a Comedy Series, receiving nominations in 2010 and 2013. In 2012, Bowen won the Critics' Choice Television Award for Best Supporting Actress in a Comedy Series. She has also been nominated twice for the Screen Actors Guild Award for Outstanding Performance by a Female Actor in a Comedy Series in 2012 and 2014. In 2009, Bowen was nominated for the Satellite Award for Best Actress in a Television Series – Musical or Comedy, and then for Best Supporting Actress – Series, Miniseries, or Television Film in 2010.

=== Haley Dunphy ===
Haley Dunphy
- First appearance: "Pilot"; 1x01, September 23, 2009
- Last appearance: "Finale"; 11x17 & 11x18, April 8, 2020
- Portrayed by: Sarah Hyland

In-universe information
- Full name: Haley Gwendolyn Dunphy
- Gender: Female
- Occupation: Student (formerly); Assistant fashion designer at Gavin Sinclair (formerly); Style editor for Nerp (currently)
- Family: Phil Dunphy (father); Claire Dunphy (mother); Alex Dunphy (sister); Luke Dunphy (brother)
- Spouse: Dylan Marshall (m. 2019)
- Significant others: Andy Bailey (Ex-Boyfriend); Ranier Shine (Ex-Boyfriend); Dr. Arvin Fennerman (Ex-Boyfriend)
- Children: George Marshall (son); Poppy Marshall (daughter)
- Relatives: Frank Dunphy (grandfather; deceased); Grace Dunphy (grandmother; deceased); Jay Pritchett (grandfather); DeDe Williams (grandmother; deceased); Gloria Delgado-Pritchett (step-grandmother); Lucas Williams (great-grandfather; deceased); Mitchell Pritchett (uncle); Joe Pritchett (half uncle); Manny Delgado (step-uncle); Lily Tucker-Pritchett (adoptive cousin); Rexford Tucker-Pritchett (adoptive cousin); Donnie Pritchett (granduncle); Becky Pritchett (grandaunt); BeBe Williams (grandaunt); CeCe Williams (grandaunt); Cameron Tucker (uncle by marriage); Lorraine Dunphy (step-grandmother); Ray (step-uncle); Farrah Marshall (mother-in-law)

Haley Gwendolyn Dunphy (Sarah Hyland) (born December 10, 1993) is the eldest daughter of Claire and Phil, who is portrayed as a stereotypical teenager. At the start of the series, Haley is a high school sophomore. Haley is depicted as being a flirt, who focuses more on social status than studies. She is a little naive, especially when it comes to arguing with her parents.

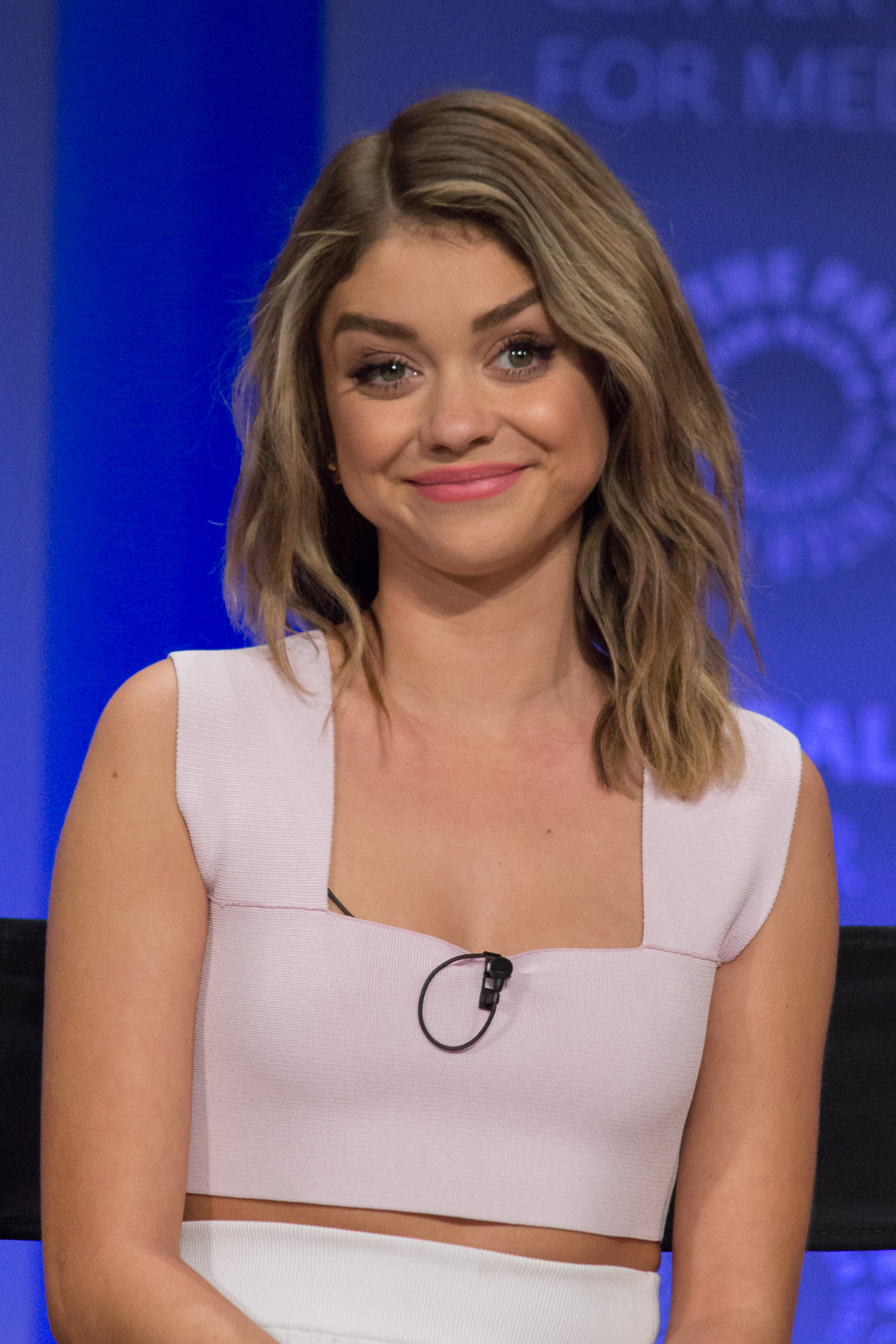
Sarah Hyland portrayed Haley Dunphy, one of the daughters.

She is concerned about her social standing at school, including her sex life, and is frequently embarrassed by her parents' conduct. Haley contemplates moving in with Dylan before learning that she got into college in the final episode of the third season. After a run-in with the law on campus in Season 4, she is expelled from college and moves back into the Dunphy home. She begins a fashion blog and goes to community college to study business and photography, eventually showing and selling her photos in an exhibit. In Season 6, she gets a job working for fashion designer Gavin Sinclair as his assistant, doing some of her design work. In season 9, episode 13, she starts working at a lifestyle company called Nerp.

Throughout Season 6, Haley develops feelings for Jay and Gloria's hired male nanny, Andy, with whom she comes to spend much of her time and with whom she begins a relationship in "White Christmas". At the end of Season 7, Andy is offered a job in his hometown in Utah and initially turns it down, but Haley encourages him to pursue it, insisting that they will figure out a way to be together. As they say goodbye at the airport, she admits that Andy is the first man she has ever really loved. As of "Weathering Heights," she is dating weatherman Rainer Shine, though they break up later in the season after he proposed, and they both realized they weren't ready. In season 9's "In Your Head," she starts dating Dr. Arvin Fennerman, Alex's astrophysics teacher at Caltech. However, a divorced Dylan reappears in the season 10 premiere and confesses that he is still in love with her and wants to be worthy. They sleep together, and Haley finds herself in love with both men. Later that season in "Torn Between Two Lovers," she finally decides Dylan is "the one" and breaks up with Arvin. In the episode "Did the Chicken Cross the Road?", she finds out she is pregnant with Dylan's baby. In the episode "Can't Elope," she marries Dylan. In the episode "A Year of Birthdays," she gives birth to twins, Poppy and George. In the series finale, the new family moves into Mitch and Cam's former duplex.

=== Alex Dunphy ===
Alex Dunphy
- First appearance: "Pilot"; 1x01, September 23, 2009
- Last appearance: "Finale"; 11x17 & 11x18, April 8, 2020
- Portrayed by: Ariel Winter

In-universe information
- Full name: Alexandra Dunphy
- Gender: Female
- Occupation: Academic Researcher
- Family: Phil Dunphy (father); Claire Dunphy (mother); Haley Dunphy (sister); Luke Dunphy (brother)
- Significant others: Sanjay Patel (ex-boyfriend); Ben (ex-boyfriend); Bill (ex-boyfriend); Dr. Arvin Fennerman (boyfriend)
- Relatives: Frank Dunphy (grandfather; deceased); Grace Dunphy (grandmother; deceased); Jay Pritchett (grandfather); DeDe Williams (grandmother; deceased); Gloria Delgado-Pritchett (step-grandmother); Lucas Williams (great-grandfather; deceased); George Marshall (nephew); Poppy Marshall (niece); Dylan Marshall (brother-in-law); Mitchell Pritchett (uncle); Joe Pritchett (half uncle); Lily Tucker-Pritchett (adoptive cousin); Rexford Tucker-Pritchett (adoptive cousin); Donnie Pritchett (granduncle); Becky Pritchett (grandaunt); BeBe Williams (grandaunt); CeCe Williams (grandaunt); Manny Delgado (step-uncle); Cameron Tucker (uncle by marriage); Lorraine Dunphy (step-grandmother); Ray (step-uncle)

Alexandra "Alex" Dunphy (Ariel Winter) is the younger daughter of Claire and Phil. Characteristically nerdy but still cute, Alex is the most intelligent of the three siblings and a polar opposite of Haley. She is very bright academically and cares much more about her studies than her social life. Described in her official ABC bio as "super smart but in a completely likeable way", she is the middle child to a shallow older sister and a goofy younger brother, and enjoys "messing with them".

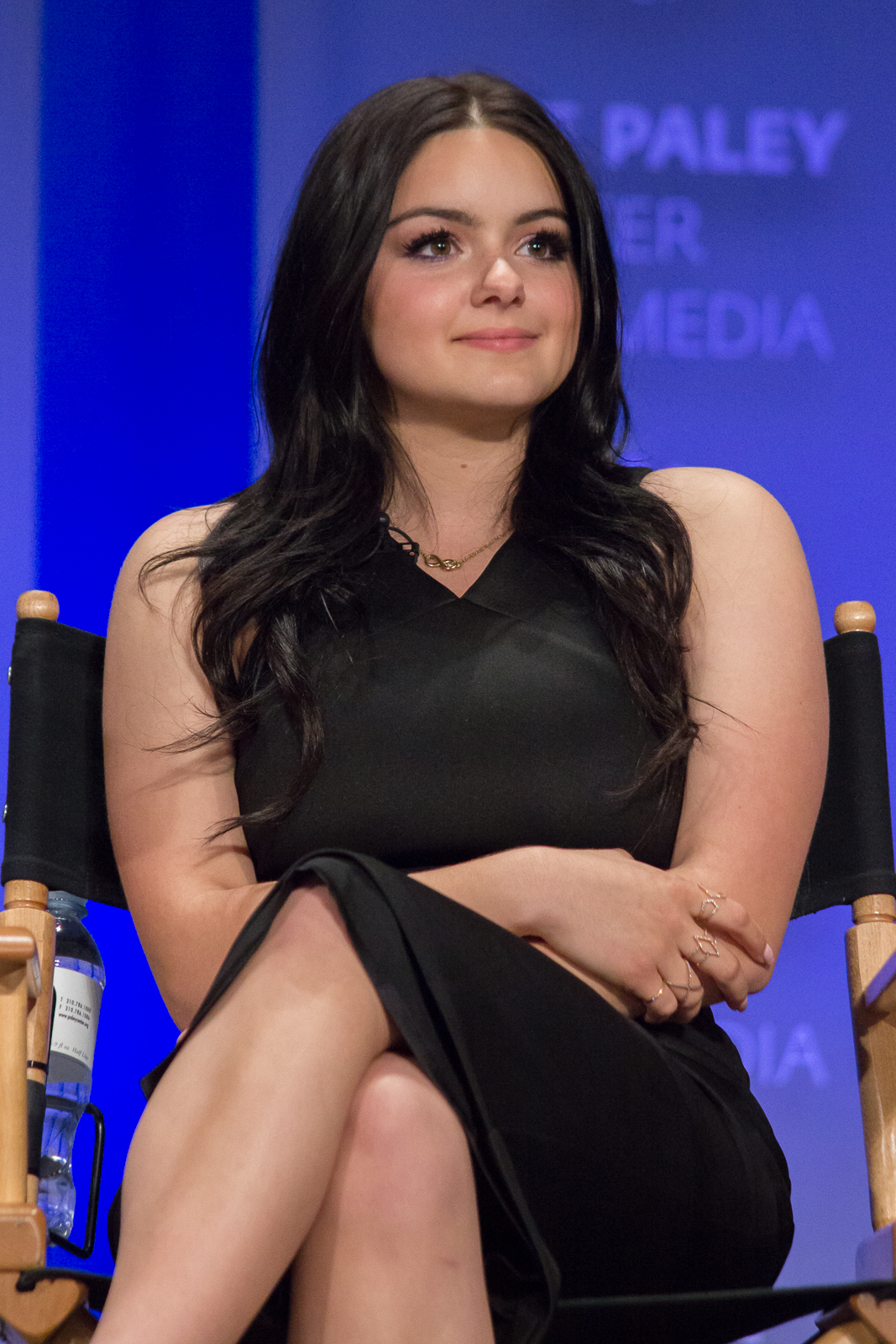
Ariel Winter portrayed Alex Dunphy, one of the daughters.

As a stereotypical precocious kid, Alex displays a sense of superiority due to her intelligence, continually putting her accomplishments on display and demanding recognition for them. An overachiever, she plays the cello; she chose to play the cello because she would have a better chance at being in a university orchestra than if she played the violin as cellos are more in demand. While she has sometimes felt isolated from her peers (once sadly telling her parents "I have no friends"), she has a group of nerdy fans at school who idolize her. Haley sincerely tells Alex at one point that she is smart and attractive in a successful effort to get her to give a light-hearted graduation speech instead of a harsh one (it worked well enough that her classmates invited her to a post-ceremony party). At the beginning of Season 3, she was in a long-distance relationship with a boy she met in Wyoming. Later in the season, she went to her prom with a classmate who everyone believes is gay.

It is established in the episode "Tableau Vivant" that Alex is a light sleeper, as she was surprisingly energetic when staying awake nearly a whole night thinking about her upcoming art project. The episode "Heart Broken" reveals that Alex suffers from hemophobia. In the second episode of Season 5 onwards, she starts wearing new glasses. In Season 6, Alex seeks the best college to enroll in and thinking about getting away from her family for a while. While Alex was not accepted into Harvard, she was accepted into Caltech, where she has been attending since the start of Season 7. She had to take a leave of absence due to getting mono, but eventually graduated. She was dating Sanjay Patel until he broke up with her in "The Closet Case". Alex is also encouraged by her grandfather Jay in her pursuits, through his belief that she will eventually inherit the position of "leader" of the family after him, as the two smartest members of the family.

In season 8, she has a relationship with Ben (Joe Mande), who works at Pritchett's Closets & Blinds, but later breaks up with him. In the season 9 episode "Royal Visit," she starts dating Bill (Jimmy Tatro), a firefighter who rescued her when she burned a bagel in her room's microwave. Though he is handsome and muscular, Alex is a bit ashamed because he is not very intellectual, and they later break up. In the series finale, as a researcher for Caltech, Alex moves to Switzerland to participate in a major new project, and begins dating her former professor, Arvin.

=== Luke Dunphy ===
Luke Dunphy
- First appearance: "Pilot"; 1x01, September 23, 2009
- Last appearance: "Finale"; 11x17 & 11x18, April 8, 2020
- Portrayed by: Nolan Gould

In-universe information
- Full name: Lucas Philip Dunphy
- Gender: Male
- Occupation: Student
- Family: Phil Dunphy (father); Claire Dunphy (mother); Haley Dunphy (sister); Alex Dunphy (sister)
- Significant others: Rose (Ex-Girlfriend); Sherry Shaker (Ex-Girlfriend)
- Relatives: Frank Dunphy (grandfather; deceased); Grace Dunphy (grandmother; deceased); Jay Pritchett (grandfather); DeDe Williams (grandmother; deceased); Gloria Delgado-Pritchett (step-grandmother); Lucas Williams (great-grandfather; deceased); George Marshall (nephew); Poppy Marshall (niece); Dylan Marshall (brother-in-law); Mitchell Pritchett (uncle); Joe Pritchett (half uncle); Lily Tucker-Pritchett (adoptive cousin); Rexford Tucker-Pritchett (adoptive cousin); Donnie Pritchett (granduncle); Becky Pritchett (grandaunt); BeBe Williams (grandaunt); CeCe Williams (grandaunt); Manny Delgado (step-uncle); Cameron Tucker (uncle by marriage); Lorraine Dunphy (step-grandmother); Ray (step-uncle)

Lucas Philip "Luke" Dunphy (Nolan Gould) is Claire and Phil's rambunctious son, who is often doing his own thing. He was named after his great-grandfather, Lucas (DeDe's father). At times, he can be a troublemaker, once shooting his sister with a toy gun and getting into a fight with Manny at school. Luke is playful, very innocent, and does not always understand the repercussions of his actions; he once announced at a family gathering that his mom thought her dad's new wife was a "gold digger", although he had misheard it as "coal digger". Unlike his sister Alex, Luke never wins any awards at school except once when Claire meddles to get him the Integrity Award by moving the car of the first choice nominee in the disabled parking.

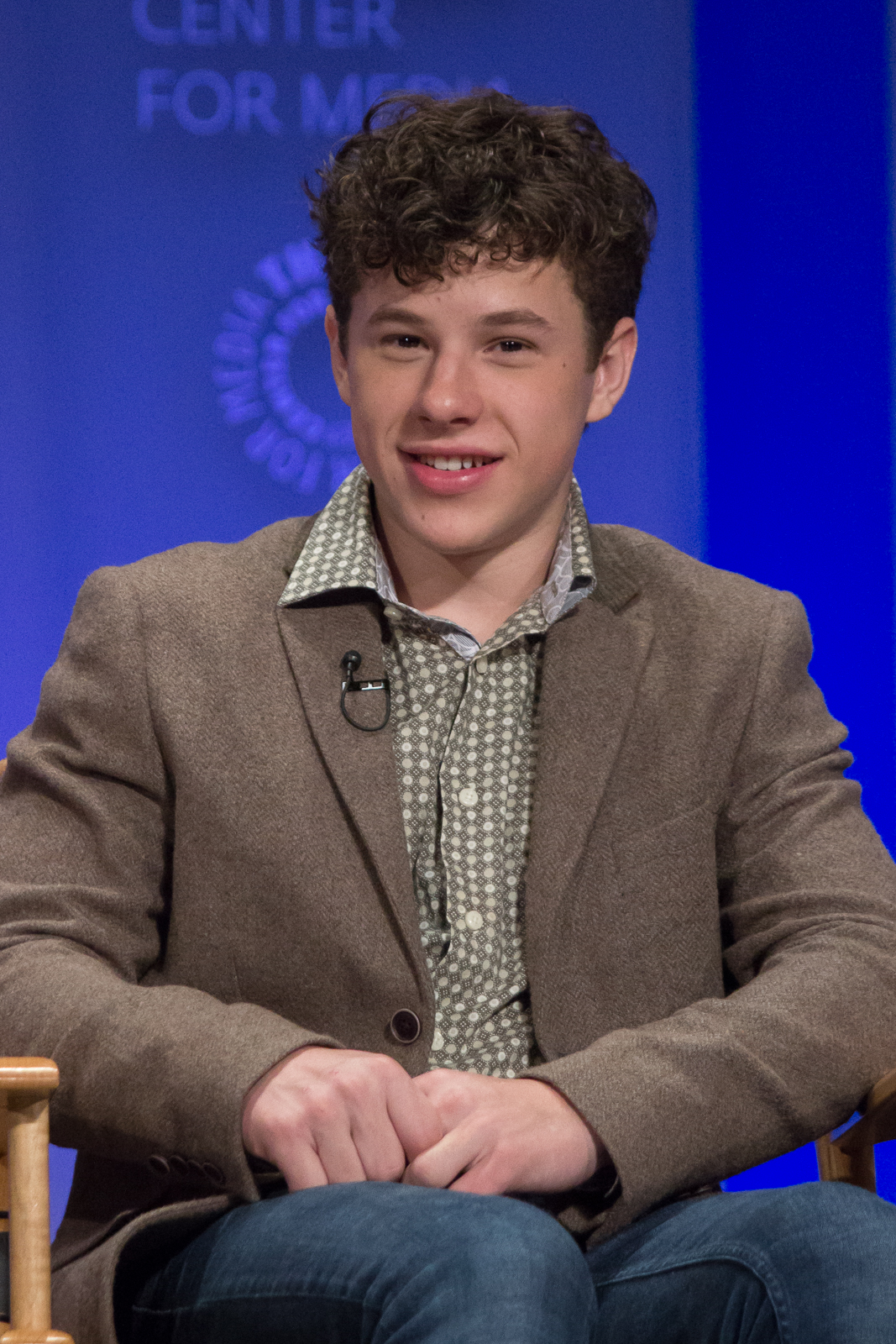
Nolan Gould portrayed Lucas Dunphy, the son.

Luke is also thought to be rather vacuous because of many questionable actions, such as getting his head stuck in the railing and jumping on the trampoline wearing only underwear and a box on his head. Both parents agree that they "dropped the ball" with raising Luke; this is exemplified when Luke states that he was still wearing diapers when he was five years old. Phil once tells Claire that he considers Luke to be their dumbest child (although he conceded to Claire's assertion that Haley was, in fact, dumber than Luke). A psychologist who evaluated him said his type of behavior was normal for someone with above-average intelligence; afterward, Phil and Claire accidentally left a wandering Luke behind when they left the psychologist's office, but they ended up being impressed by how calmly he made his way back home (in a limo) and decided he would do just fine in life. Subsequent events have borne this out, as he only got into one college he applied to (and did so because Phil gave up some magic secrets to his former rival-turned-Dean of Admissions) but has become a well-paid social fixture at Jay's country club and shows he can use his connections to help his family. In the series finale, he is accepted into and enrolls at the University of Oregon. He is frequently seen playing a Nintendo DS Lite later 3DS. Throughout the series, he is often seen playing with Manny. Often, they do not just play but develop plans, plots, and ploys. Being that Luke's birthday is November 28, it sometimes coincides with Thanksgiving.

=== Dylan Marshall ===
Dylan Marshall
- First appearance: "Pilot"; 1x01, September 23, 2009
- Last appearance: "Finale"; 11x17 & 11x18, April 8, 2020
- Portrayed by: Reid Ewing

In-universe information
- Full name: Dylan Stardust Marshall
- Gender: Male
- Occupation: Musician, cowboy (formerly), Disneyland Cast Member (formerly), limo driver (formerly), sign spinner (formerly), T-shirt designer (formerly); Nursing student
- Family: Farrah Marshall (mother); Unnamed father Unnamed sibling(s); 1 Unnamed nephew
- Spouses: Elaine Kolchek (m. 2016; div. 2018) Haley Dunphy (m. 2019)
- Children: George Marshall (son); Poppy Marshall (daughter)
- Relatives: Phil Dunphy (father-in-law); Claire Dunphy (mother-in-law); Alex Dunphy (sister-in-law); Luke Dunphy (brother-in-law); Jay Pritchett (grandfather-in-law); DeDe Williams (grandmother-in-law; deceased); Gloria Delgado-Pritchett (step-grandmother-in-law); Frank Dunphy (grandfather-in-law; deceased); Grace Dunphy (grandmother-in-law; deceased); Lucas Williams (great-grandfather-in-law; deceased); Mitchell Pritchett (uncle-in-law); Joe Pritchett (half uncle-in-law); Manny Delgado (step-uncle-in-law); Lily Tucker-Pritchett (adoptive cousin-in-law); Rexford Tucker-Pritchett (adoptive cousin-in-law); Donnie Pritchett (granduncle-in-law); Becky Pritchett (grandaunt-in-law); BeBe Williams (grandaunt-in-law); CeCe Williams (grandaunt-in-law); Cameron Tucker (uncle-in-law by marriage); Lorraine Dunphy (step-grandmother-in-law); Ray (step-uncle-in-law)

Dylan Stardust Marshall (Reid Ewing), sometimes called "D-Money" by Phil, is the on-and-off boyfriend (and eventual husband) of Haley Dunphy, introduced as a senior in high school who plays guitar, sings in a band, and has no plans for college. He is often put into awkward situations by Phil, who wishes for the two to be friends. He has diverse interests that are often surprising, such as his love of old Western films. He also sometimes reveals a sort-of attraction to Claire when he gives her a rose on Valentine's Day, saying that "every mom should look as tasty as you when they're old." He also had a dream involving a (suggested) sexual encounter involving himself, Haley, and Claire. Claire strongly dislikes him, to the point of trying to introduce other boys to Haley just so that they break up or don't get back together. He loves the confidence Haley gets from being part of such a loving family and does not mind hanging around during family get-togethers. He wrote a song for Haley, "In the Moonlight (Do Me)," and performed it for her extended family. The song was about sex, and most of the family were surprised by the suggestive lyrics, but it became stuck in all of their heads the next day. He finds inspiration for his music from Bob Dylan, Sum 41, Blink-182 and New Kids on the Block.

Dylan temporarily leaves the cast to work on a ranch after Haley rejects his marriage proposal in the first episode of season three, "Dude Ranch". In the episode "Virgin Territory" Alex reveals that Haley had lost her virginity to Dylan before they broke up; she told Claire three months earlier, but not Phil. In the episode "Disneyland," Dylan reveals he lost his job on the ranch and moved back to California, taking a job at Disneyland as a Dapper Dan. He and Haley get back together to Claire's dismay and Phil's delight. In the season finale, "Baby on Board," Haley discovers she was accepted to college. She and Dylan maintain their relationship, and Dylan lives with the Dunphys for a few months. In Season 4, Dylan is invited to move in with Cam and Mitch after his job as a limo driver led him to their Valentine's Day party. He ends up getting fired, and while Cam and Mitch separately tell him he can stick around, Lily angrily tells him he isn't welcome there and shouts at him until he leaves the house. In Season 8, he marries a doctor named Elaine Kolchek and has three step-kids, much to Haley's dismay as she feels she lost her "romantic safety net". By Season 9, Elaine has left him for her ex-husband. In Season 10, Dylan and Haley get back together and she becomes pregnant. They marry and deliver twins, Poppy and George. In the series finale, the new family moves into Mitch and Cam's former duplex.

== The Pritchett family ==
=== Jay Pritchett ===
Jay Pritchett
- First appearance: "Pilot"; 1x01, September 23, 2009
- Last appearance: "Finale"; 11x17 & 11x18, April 8, 2020
- Portrayed by: Ed O'Neill

In-universe information
- Full name: Jay Francis Pritchett
- Gender: Male
- Occupation: Retired business owner
- Family: Donnie Pritchett (brother); Becky Pritchett (sister)
- Spouses: DeDe Williams (m. 1968; div. 2003) (Note: In an episode from the second season that aired in 2011, Claire and Mitchell recalled a childhood incident that occurred twenty years prior, and later said that their parents divorced "twelve years later". With this information, twenty years prior to 2011 is 1991, and twelve years after that is 2003. In the third season, Jay comments that he and DeDe were married for thirty-five years.) Gloria Delgado (m. 2008)
- Children: Claire Dunphy (daughter); Mitchell Pritchett (son); Joe Pritchett (son); Manny Delgado (stepson)
- Relatives: Haley Dunphy (granddaughter); Alex Dunphy (granddaughter); Luke Dunphy (grandson); Lily Tucker-Pritchett (adoptive granddaughter); Rexford Tucker-Pritchett (adoptive grandson); Phil Dunphy (son-in-law); Cameron Tucker (son-in-law); George Marshall (great-grandson); Poppy Marshall (great-granddaughter); Dylan Marshall (grandson-in-law); Michael Pritchett (nephew); Brian (nephew); Melanie Pritchett (grandniece); Irene Pritchett (sister-in-law); Fulgencio Ramírez (father-in-law; deceased); Pilar Ramírez (mother-in-law); Sonia Ramírez (sister-in-law); Lucas Williams (ex-father-in-law; deceased); BeBe Williams (ex-sister-in-law); CeCe Williams (ex-sister-in-law)

Jay Francis Pritchett (Ed O'Neill) is the father of Claire, Mitchell, and Joe; husband of Gloria; maternal grandfather of Haley, Alex, Luke; and paternal grandfather of Lily and Rexford; father-in-law of Phil and Cam; and step-father of Manny. He is the ex-owner of a closet company and is presumably the wealthiest family member and, occasionally, the family's chieftain in many situations. Jay has a dry and sarcastic sense of humor. As with his son and daughter, Jay is generally more realistic, mild-mannered, and sensible than his partner, Gloria, who is unashamed because Jay is many years her senior. A recurring plot involves Jay's relationship with his son Mitchell, which became more complicated due to Jay's reaction to Mitchell's sexual orientation. Humor and plot points are also derived from Jay's relationship with his son-in-law Phil; Jay often mistreats and antagonizes him despite Phil's constant attempts to gain Jay's approval. Nevertheless, Jay thinks very highly of Phil, despite their differences, and said so in Season 3. Jay also believes that Alex will eventually become "leader" of the family after him, as she is the only other capable person who can manage the other family members' eccentricities.

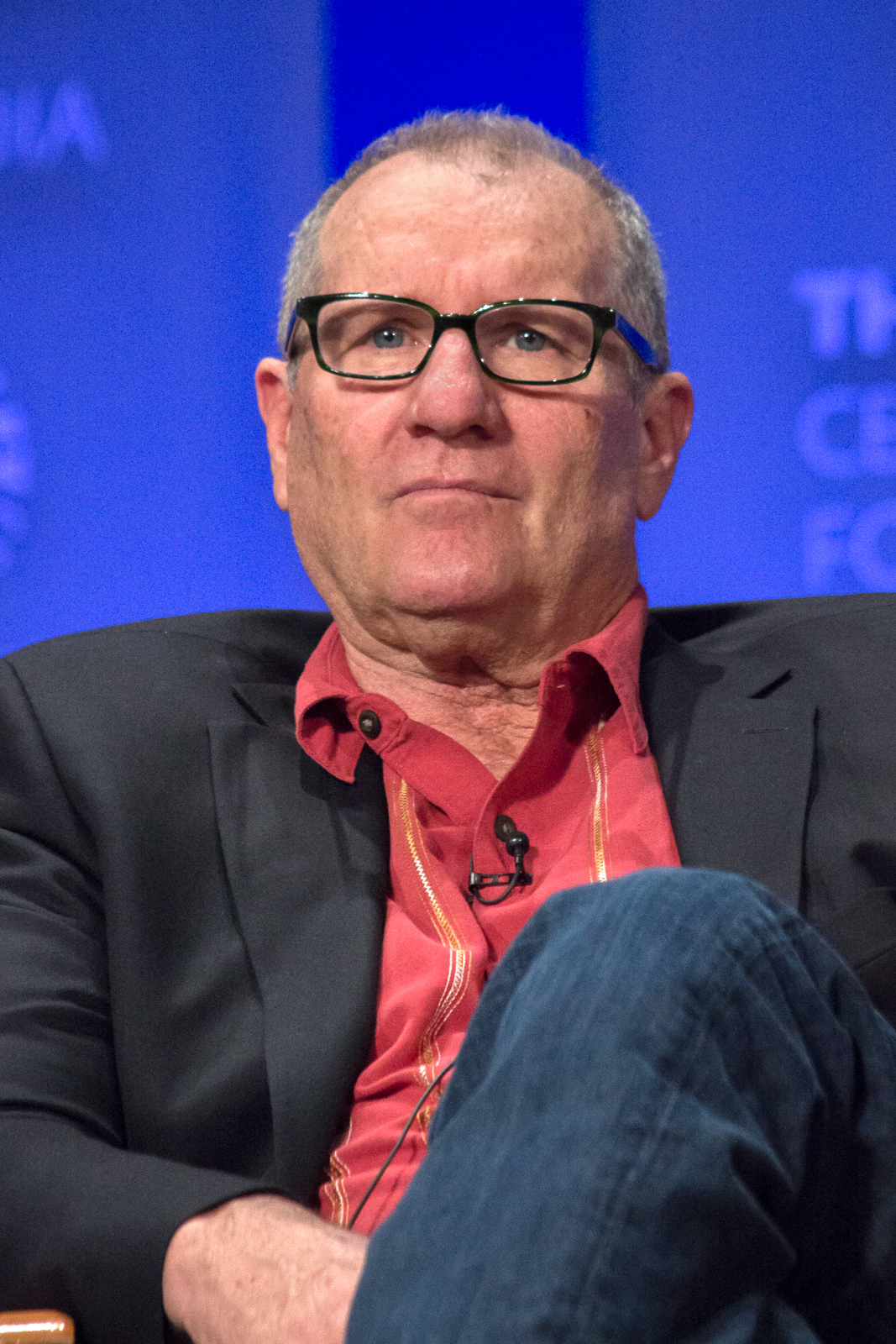
Ed O'Neill portrayed Jay Pritchett, the father of four, husband of his second wife, Gloria.

Jay has several masculine character attributes, including a fondness for sports and model airplanes. Jay is also shown to be compassionate occasionally, showing affection for members of the extended family, particularly to Manny, his step-son; their relationship seems to become more positive as the series progresses, eventually becoming a typical father-son relationship, and Jay eventually comes to see Manny as his third child. The third season's finale reveals that Gloria is pregnant, but Jay does not know yet. In the first episode of the fourth season, Gloria tells Jay and he tells her that it's the greatest news he has heard. The baby was male, which relieved Jay because it says in the episode "Snip" that he was afraid of having a girl. Jay is a dog-lover. He sometimes goes overboard in treating his dog, Stella, as his favorite member of the family, much to Gloria's chagrin, and Jay is thrilled when he realizes that Joe is not allergic to Stella, but to Gloria's face cream, in the episode "Rash Decisions". Jay is farsighted (hyperopia). Jay served in the United States Navy during the Vietnam War. His birthday is April 1, as shown in the episode "Grill, Interrupted".

==== Accolades ====
O'Neill was consecutively nominated for the Primetime Emmy Award for Outstanding Supporting Actor in a Comedy Series in 2011, 2012, and 2013. In 2011, he was nominated for the Screen Actors Guild Award for Outstanding Performance by a Male Actor in a Comedy Series and Critics' Choice Television Award for Best Supporting Actor in a Comedy Series.

=== Gloria Pritchett ===
Gloria Pritchett
- First appearance: "Pilot"; 1x01, September 23, 2009
- Last appearance: "Finale"; 11x17 & 11x18, April 8, 2020
- Portrayed by: Sofía Vergara

In-universe information
- Full name: Gloria Maria Ramirez Pritchett
- Gender: Female
- Occupation: Hairdresser (formerly); Taxi driver (formerly); Housewife (formerly); Realtor
- Family: Fulgencio Ramírez (father; deceased); Pilar Ramírez (mother); Sonia Ramírez (sister); 2 unnamed brothers
- Spouses: Javier Delgado (m. 1995; div. 2002) Jay Pritchett (m. 2008)
- Children: Manny Delgado (son); Joe Pritchett (son); Claire Dunphy (stepdaughter); Mitchell Pritchett (stepson)
- Relatives: Umberto Morales (grandfather; deceased); Ana-Maria Rosa de la Immaculada Jimenez Morales (grandmother; deceased); Haley Dunphy (step-granddaughter); Alex Dunphy (step-granddaughter); Luke Dunphy (step-grandson); Lily Tucker-Pritchett (adoptive step-granddaughter); Rexford Tucker-Pritchett (adoptive step-grandson); Phil Dunphy (step-son-in-law); Cameron Tucker (step-son-in-law); George Marshall (step-great-grandson); Poppy Marshall (step-great-granddaughter); Dylan Marshall (step-grandson-in-law); Donnie Pritchett (brother-in-law); Becky Pritchett (sister-in-law); Rosa Marina (cousin); Armando (cousin)
- Religion: Roman Catholic
- Nationality: Colombian/American

Gloria Maria Ramirez Pritchett (Sofía Vergara), formerly Delgado and née Ramirez, is Jay's second wife and mother to Manny and Joe. She is from Barranquilla, Colombia (as is Sofía Vergara herself). She is a very loving wife and mother. At first, the family (specifically Claire) does not accept her because of her age difference to Jay. In the episode "Coal Digger," Luke calls her a coal digger, a mishearing of when Claire called her a gold digger. The most frequent running gag involving the character is her mispronunciation of common English words and phrases. Vergara confirmed that many of these mispronunciations are improvised.

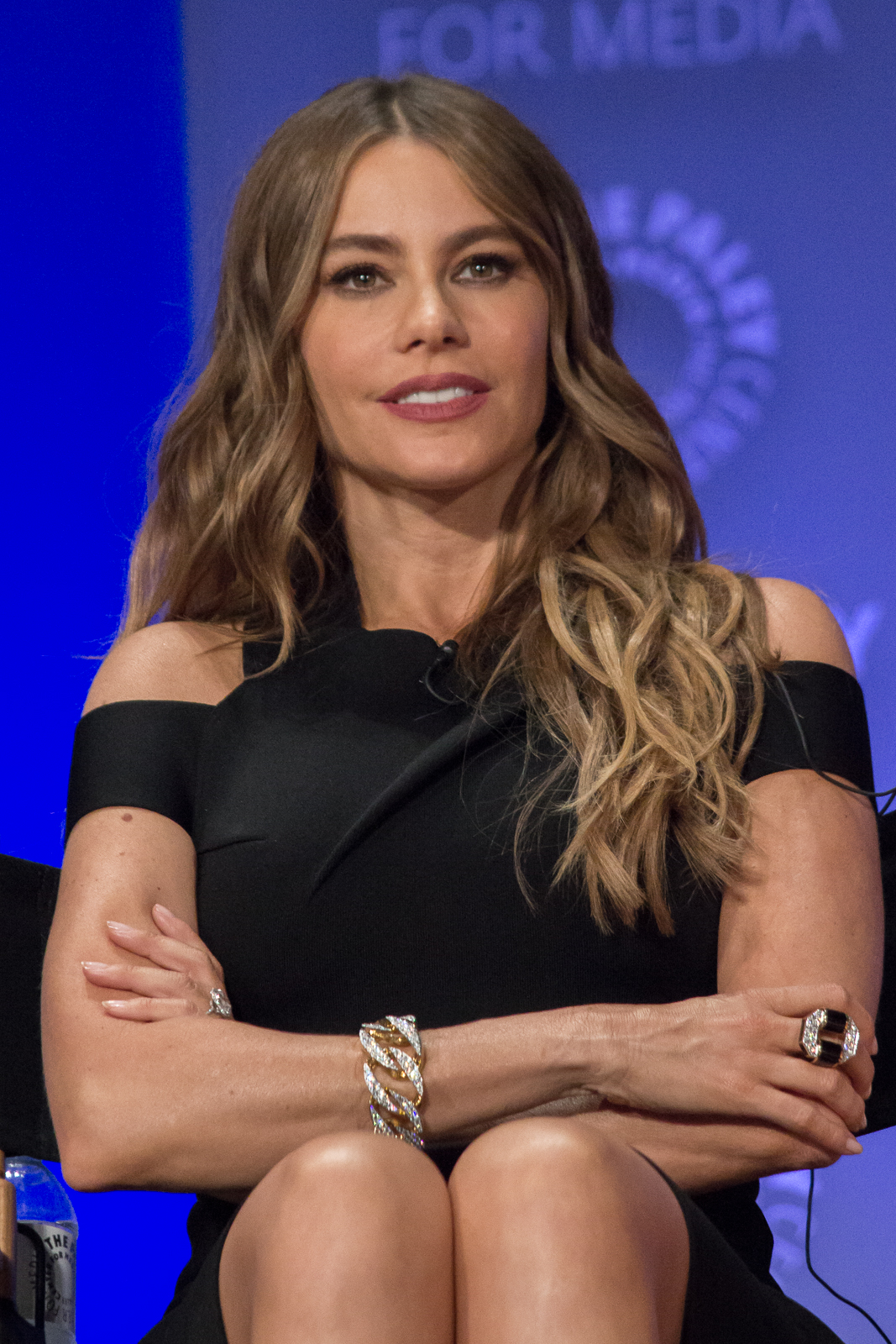
Sofía Vergara portrayed Gloria Delgado-Pritchett, wife of her second husband Jay, mother of two, and stepmother of two.

Gloria often supports Manny when Jay tries to tell him to be less sensitive or hide his cultural background. However, she does occasionally display some odd parenting techniques. For example, when Manny was first born, she had wanted a daughter, and therefore for the first year of his life, she dressed him like one and told all her friends he was a girl. She later told Manny (after he found the pictures of himself like this) that the child in question was his "twin sister who died at the age of one". In the sixth episode of Season One, she chastises Jay for forcing Manny to remove his poncho for school. When they get to the school to return the poncho and realize that Manny has a plan to play folk music to his classmates with his pan flute (which was inside the poncho), Gloria tells Jay to break the flute, saying in her interview that "the poncho by itself is fine. The poncho, plus the flute, plus the stupid dance? My son will die a virgin."

Gloria is a terrible driver, though she is oblivious to this. She is also very comfortable with death (on one occasion killing and beheading a rat with a shovel right before she left for church and leaving the head "as a warning to the other rats"), on account of a couple of her relatives being butchers. She is an excellent marksman, often just using one hand and never misses a shot, even saying to Manny that she could have unbuttoned his shirt if she wanted to with her gun (formerly Manny's BB gun). She has a very high tolerance for spicy food and has the strongest religious views of any family member. She loves her family and spends a great deal of time with Lily because she fixates on having a daughter. Mitchell and Cameron asked her and Jay to become guardians of Lily if anything were to happen to them.

Gloria has something of a shady past. Doubts have also been raised about her income: her only mentioned employment was as a hairdresser (and later as a taxi driver), and Claire, Jay's daughter, originally labeled Gloria as a "gold-digger" for marrying her wealthy father. It seems likely that Jay is her major source of income. However, in the Season 5 episode "A Hard Jay's Night," the hair shop where she used to work is shown, and it is clarified that Jay is indeed her major current source of income. In the final episode of Season 3, it was revealed that she is pregnant. Her newest son, Fulgencio, a.k.a. Joe, is born in the Season 4 episode "Party Crasher". In the episode "Fifteen Percent," she reveals that she comes from a neighborhood of prostitutes after she said her neighborhood had a saying that "Love is just around the corner." The Hispanic American character of Gloria was based on the character of Angela in the Jim Jarmusch film Night on Earth (1991), played by American actress Rosie Perez. In season 6, Gloria officially became an American citizen.

==== Accolades ====
Sofía Vergara has been nominated four times for the Primetime Emmy Award for Outstanding Supporting Actress in a Comedy Series and the Golden Globe Award for Best Supporting Actress – Series, Miniseries, or Television Film. In 2011, Vergara was nominated for the Best Supporting Actress – Series, Miniseries, or Television Film and Critics' Choice Television Award for Best Supporting Actress in a Comedy Series. She was also nominated for the Screen Actors Guild Award for Outstanding Performance by a Female Actor in a Comedy Series in 2011, 2012, and 2013.

=== Manny Delgado ===
Manny Delgado
- First appearance: "Pilot"; 1x01, September 23, 2009
- Last appearance: "Finale"; 11x17 & 11x18, April 8, 2020
- Portrayed by: Rico Rodriguez

In-universe information
- Full name: Manuel Alberto Javier Alejandro Ramirez Delgado
- Gender: Male
- Occupation: Student
- Family: Javier Delgado (father); Gloria Delgado-Pritchett (mother); Jay Pritchett (stepfather); Joe Pritchett (half brother); Claire Dunphy (stepsister); Mitchell Pritchett (stepbrother)
- Relatives: Fulgencio Ramírez (grandfather; deceased); Pilar Ramírez (grandmother); Sonia Ramírez (aunt); Umberto Morales (great-grandfather; deceased); Ana-Maria Rosa de la Immaculada Jimenez Morales (great-grandmother; deceased); Phil Dunphy (stepbrother-in-law); Cameron Tucker (stepbrother-in-law); Haley Dunphy (step-niece); Alex Dunphy (step-niece); Luke Dunphy (step-nephew); Lily Tucker-Pritchett (adoptive step-niece); Rexford Tucker-Pritchett (adoptive step-nephew); Dylan Marshall (step-nephew-in-law); George Marshall (step-grandnephew); Poppy Marshall (step-grandniece)
- Nationality: Colombian-American

Manuel Alberto Javier Alejandro "Manny" Ramirez Delgado (Rico Rodriguez), Gloria's son from her first marriage to Javier, is very outgoing but rather self-conscious. He is brilliant, probably second after Alex, but in a creative, rather than academic, way. He is also mature and intuitive for his age and is often shown doing adult-like things, such as writing precocious poetry for his crushes who are mostly older than him, having conversations with Claire about her marriage and kids, and drinking coffee. He even engaged in the stock market business and briefly considered following his biological father's footsteps by becoming a professional gambler.

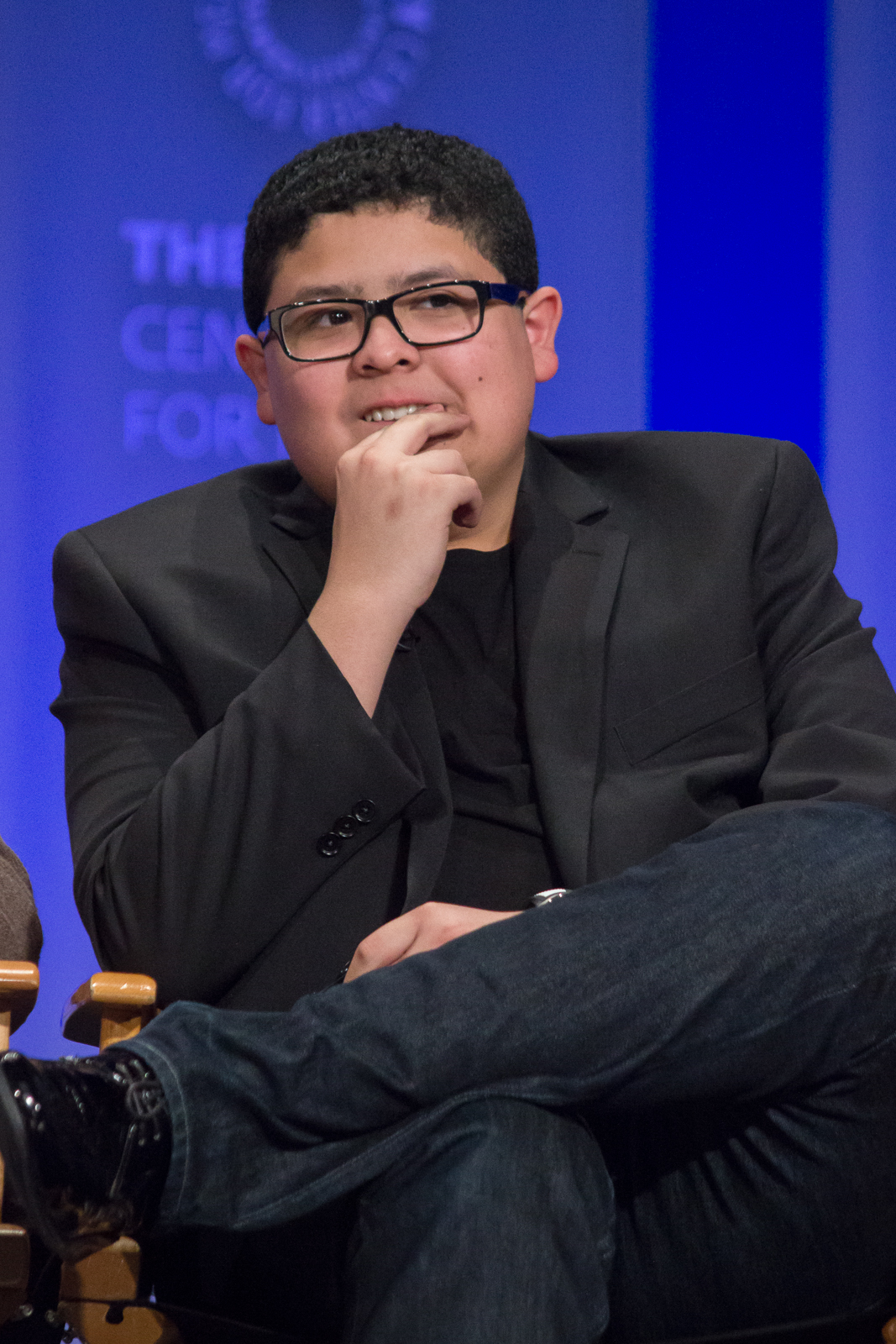
Rico Rodriguez portrayed Manny Delgado, Gloria's son and Jay's stepson.

Manny has inherited his mother's passion for life (although he is terrified of butterflies), though Gloria has also said, "Manny is passionate, just like his father." This causes Manny to be very romantic. Manny is not afraid to take chances, leading him to ask out older girls, and develops a crush on his step-niece Haley, to whom he gave flowers on "Pilot" and even kissed in "Three Turkeys". He idolizes his absentee father, often speaking about him in a positive light, even after being repeatedly disappointed by his father's broken promises. He plays for a football team, fences, and is a skilled chess player. He is often seen wearing or intending to wear his "burgundy dinner jacket". Manny was in the fifth grade in Season 1, the ninth grade in Season 5, and attends his first year of college Season 9. Manny and his step-nephew Luke are good friends who each admire the strengths of the other, although they spend a great deal of scheming against/fighting with each other as well.

=== Joe Pritchett ===
Joe Pritchett
- First appearance: "Party Crasher"; 4x12, January 16, 2013
- Last appearance: "Finale"; 11x17 & 11x18, April 8, 2020
- Portrayed by: Rebecca and Sierra Mark (uncredited) (season 4); Pierce Wallace (season 5–6); Jeremy Maguire (season 7–11)

In-universe information
- Full name: Fulgencio Joseph Ramirez Pritchett
- Gender: Male
- Family: Jay Pritchett (father); Gloria Delgado-Pritchett (mother); Claire Dunphy (half-sister); Mitchell Pritchett (half-brother); Manny Delgado (half-brother)
- Relatives: Fulgencio Ramírez (grandfather; deceased); Pilar Ramírez (grandmother); Sophia Ramírez (aunt); Umberto Morales (great-grandfather; deceased); Ana-Maria Rosa de la Immaculada Jimenez Morales (great-grandmother; deceased); Donnie Pritchett (uncle); Becky Pritchett (aunt); Phil Dunphy (half-brother-in-law); Cameron Tucker (half-brother-in-law); Haley Dunphy (half-niece); Alex Dunphy (half-niece); Luke Dunphy (half-nephew); Lily Tucker-Pritchett (adoptive half-niece); Rexford Tucker-Pritchett (adoptive half-nephew); George Marshall (half-grandnephew); Poppy Marshall (half-grandniece); Dylan Marshall (half-nephew-in-law)

Fulgencio Joseph "Joe" Ramirez Pritchett (Jeremy Maguire) is Jay and Gloria's son. Gloria discovers she is pregnant with him in the final episode of season 3, his existence is revealed to the rest of the cast in the first episode of season 4, and he is born in "Party Crasher". Throughout the series, Joe is shown to be a mature, street-smart child, inheriting his wit from his father. Joe's christening takes place in "Fulgencio". In the Season 5 episode "Spring-a-Ding-Fling", he begins walking. In the episode "Larry's Wife", Gloria calls over the priest, believing that there is evil in Joe. When his birthday is celebrated in the Season 5 episode "And One to Grow On", it is indicated that his party is the day after Manny's birthday party, indicating the proximity of their birthdays. In the episode "Queer Eyes, Full Hearts", Manny's Spanish teacher teaches Joe to swim.

=== Stella ===
Stella (Brigitte) is the French Bulldog of the Pritchett family, introduced in "Good Cop Bad Dog" (season 2, episode 22). She was the dog of a man named Guillermo (Lin-Manuel Miranda), an inventor, but when Jay convinced him to abandon his idea and return to school, Guillermo gave Stella to the family. Jay wanted to get rid of her but eventually came around. She is very problematic and often destroys things, mostly Gloria's belongings. However, Jay has a great affection for her (letting her sleep in his bed and feeding her from the dinner table), which infuriates Gloria because Jay seems to pay more love and attention to the dog than to her.

== The Tucker-Pritchett family ==
=== Mitchell Pritchett ===
Mitchell Pritchett
- First appearance: "Pilot"; 1x01, September 23, 2009
- Last appearance: "Finale"; 11x17 & 11x18, April 8, 2020
- Portrayed by: Jesse Tyler Ferguson; Justin Tinucci (young)

In-universe information
- Full name: Mitchell Vincent Pritchett
- Gender: Male
- Occupation: Lawyer
- Family: Jay Pritchett (father); DeDe Williams (mother; deceased); Claire Dunphy (sister); Joe Pritchett (half brother); Gloria Delgado-Pritchett (stepmother); Manny Delgado (stepbrother)
- Spouse: Cameron Tucker (m. 2014)
- Significant others: Tracy (Ex-Girlfriend); Teddy (Ex-Boyfriend)
- Children: Lily Tucker-Pritchett (adoptive daughter); Rexford Tucker-Pritchett (adoptive son)
- Relatives: Lucas Williams (grandfather; deceased); Donnie Pritchett (uncle); Michael Pritchett (cousin); Becky Pritchett (aunt); BeBe Williams (aunt); CeCe Williams (aunt); Phil Dunphy (brother-in-law); Haley Dunphy (niece); Alex Dunphy (niece); Luke Dunphy (nephew); Dylan Marshall (nephew-in-law); George Marshall (grandnephew); Poppy Marshall (grandniece); Pameron Tucker (sister-in-law)

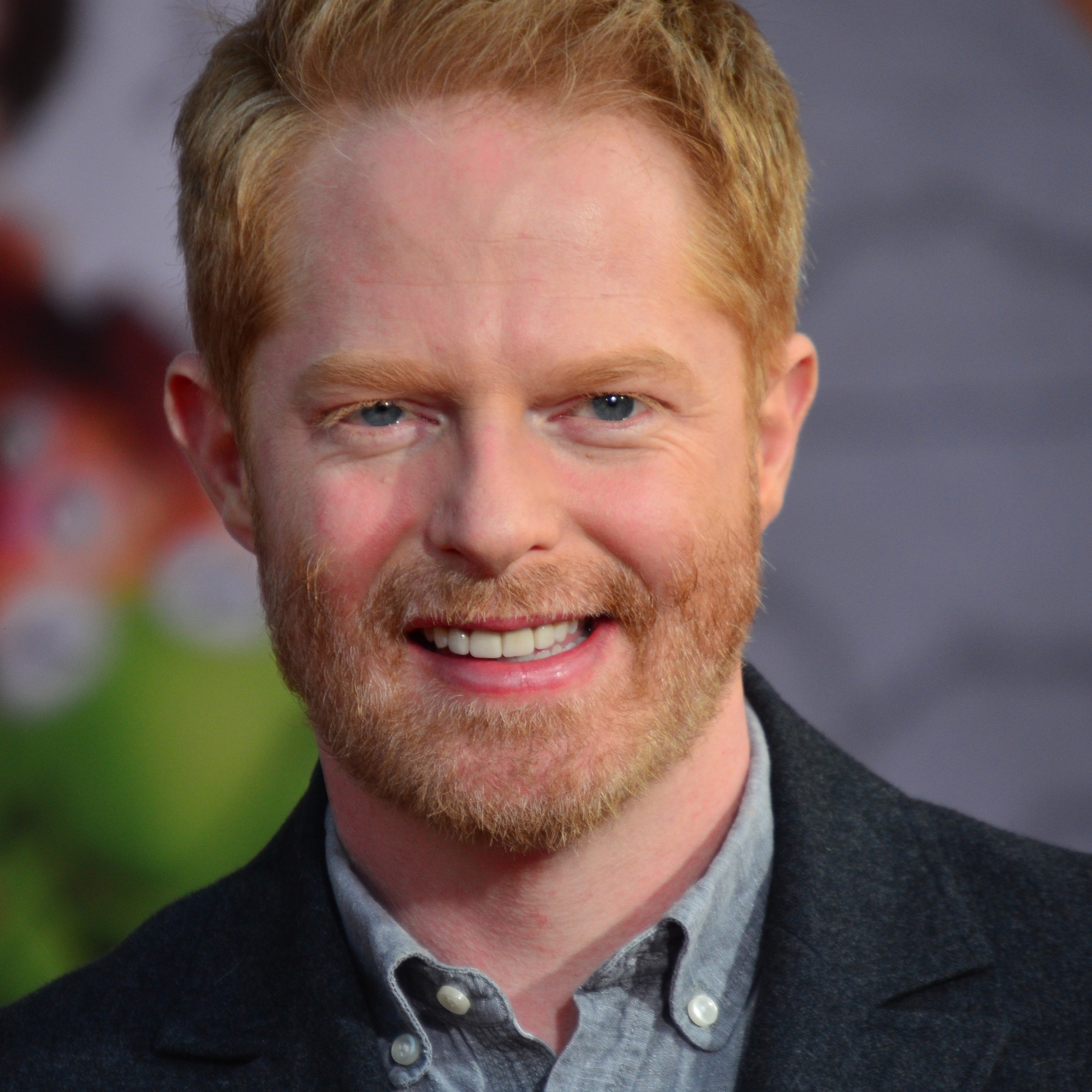
Jesse Tyler Ferguson portrayed Mitchell Pritchett, Cameron's husband and Lily and Rexford's father.

Mitchell Vincent "Mitch" Pritchett (Jesse Tyler Ferguson) is Jay's son, Claire's younger brother, Gloria's stepson, Manny's stepbrother, Joe's half brother, Haley, Alex and Luke's uncle, one of Lily's fathers, and partner of 16 years to Cameron. In the season finale of the fifth season, he and Cam get married. He is a low-key, mild-mannered person but has many sensitive qualities. Most times, he is the exact opposite of Cameron, which usually causes disagreements. Cameron acts as a counterbalance to Mitchell's uptight, worrying ways. Because of his mild-mannered, uptight nature, he is sometimes embarrassed by Cameron's flamboyance, but also takes pride in his many talents. He is uncomfortable with public displays of affection, as well as invasion of his personal space. He is an overprotective and cautious father. He is shown to be a capable lawyer, even representing an entire building full of people one-by-one with no prior notice. A recurring theme on the show is Mitchell's relationship with his father, which was strained by the revelation of Mitchell's homosexuality. Mitchell is a musical theater fan and enjoyed ice skating as a kid, though he later admitted that he liked working with his sister as a team more than the ice skating itself. Although he fancies himself as a handyman, everybody is afraid of him around tools. From his degrees hanging in his office, it is apparent that Mitchell attended undergrad at Cornell University and law school at Columbia University.

==== Accolades ====
Jesse Tyler Ferguson has been nominated five times for the Primetime Emmy Award for Outstanding Supporting Actor in a Comedy Series.

=== Cameron Tucker ===
Cameron Tucker
- First appearance: "Pilot"; 1x01, September 23, 2009
- Last appearance: "Finale"; 11x17 & 11x18, April 8, 2020
- Portrayed by: Eric Stonestreet

In-universe information
- Full name: Cameron Scott Tucker
- Gender: Male
- Occupation: Clown; Christmas Caroler; Music teacher Middle school music teacher History teacher High School Football Coach & Physical Education Teacher; High school vice principal College Football Head Coach
- Family: Merle Tucker (father); Barbara "Barb" Jammy Tucker (mother); Pameron "Pam" Jessica Tucker (sister); 2 unnamed biological siblings
- Spouse: Mitchell Pritchett (m. 2014)
- Children: Lily Tucker-Pritchett (adoptive daughter); Rexford Tucker-Pritchett (adoptive son)
- Relatives: Bitsy (grandmother); Betsy (aunt); Carl (uncle); Pat (biological aunt); Calhoun Johnson (nephew); Jay Pritchett (father-in-law); DeDe Williams (mother-in-law; deceased); Gloria Delgado-Pritchett (stepmother-in-law); Claire Dunphy (sister-in-law); Joe Pritchett (half brother-in-law); Manny Delgado (stepbrother-in-law); Haley Dunphy (niece by marriage); Alex Dunphy (niece by marriage); Luke Dunphy (nephew by marriage); Dylan Marshall (nephew-in-law by marriage); George Marshall (grandnephew by marriage); Poppy Marshall (grandniece by marriage)
- Nationality: American

Cameron Scott "Cam" Tucker (Eric Stonestreet), (February 29, 1972) is Mitchell's husband of eight years, and one of Lily's fathers, who has a huge dramatic personality. He frequently behaves like a drama queen. His bubbly, outgoing personality contrasts with Mitchell's uptight manner, which often causes the two to bicker between themselves. Cameron was born on February 29, 1972, and grew up on a farm in Missouri. He was a starting center for the University of Illinois football team (which he and Jay bond over, much to Mitchell's envy) and is a huge sports fan. Although Cam has gained weight since college and is not as muscular as he used to be, he is still physically quite imposing, partly owing to his height of 6'1", and capable of scaring off anyone who threatens Mitchell. Cameron also fosters many unusual hobbies such as collecting antique fountain pens, being adept in Japanese flower arrangement, and is a classically trained Auguste clown named Fizbo. Cameron prides himself in shooting home films, not movies, and takes that role very seriously. At the beginning of the series, he acts as a stay-at-home dad to Lily, though it is mentioned that he had taught music before this. In the later seasons, Cameron begins working as a football coach. Cameron is also an experienced rock drummer and, as a result, was brought in at the last minute to play in Dylan's band when they needed a replacement percussionist. Cameron is overly emotional about Lily, their adoptive daughter and doesn't approve of Mitchell's more strict parenting methods, such as letting her cry herself to sleep if she wakes up in the middle of the night.

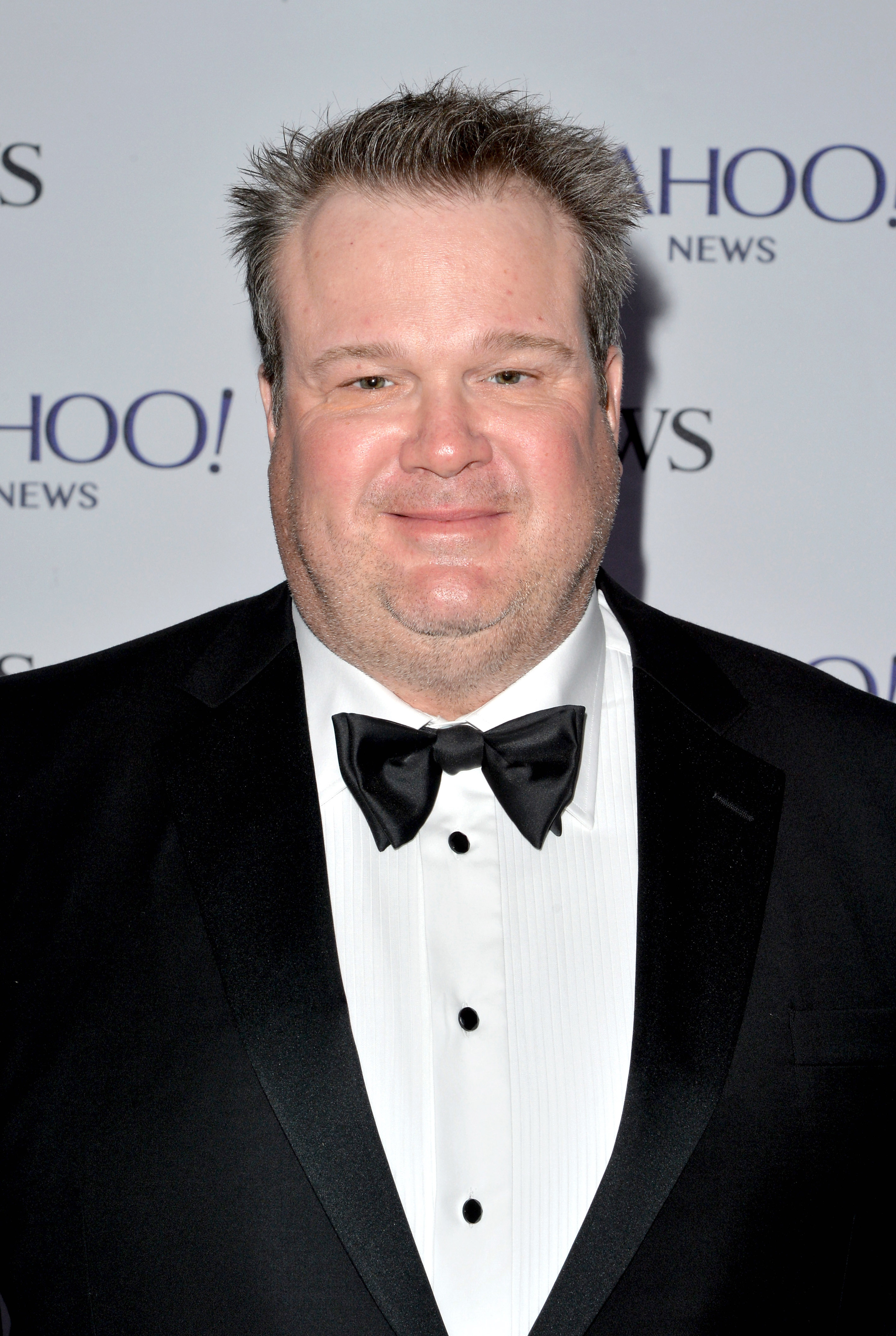
Eric Stonestreet portrayed Cameron Tucker, Mitchell's husband and father of two.

It is also mentioned that Cameron was considerably thinner and in better shape when he first started dating Mitchell. For the first few episodes, his relationship with Mitchell was somewhat strained (as they disagreed on almost everything and showed very different parenting techniques). But in more recent episodes, the relationship is much happier. Cameron and Mitchell met at one of Pepper Saltzman's "legendary" soirees, where during a game of charades, Cameron immediately knew the answer, "Casablanca," based on a subtle gesture Mitchell made with his hands. Common interests, like art, led them to form a relationship. Mitchell is impressed by Cameron's quirks, such as speaking French (to which Cameron replies, "un peu," meaning "a little"). Cameron is also said to be a huge fan of the movie The Wizard of Oz in the episode "Leap Day" when Mitchell plans him a surprise birthday party.

During season 4, Cameron goes back to work as a music teacher at Luke and Manny's school. In season 5, his music teacher job is eliminated, but he becomes the freshman football coach and physical education teacher. In season 6, he is promoted to varsity coach, and his undefeated record and open homosexuality earned him a story on the local television news.

==== Critical reception ====
Eric Stonestreet has received positive reviews for his characters. In a review of the first season, Robert Canning of IGN named Cameron Tucker the best character of the season, saying, "Cameron's many talents and passions revealed over the course of this first year became an ever-building running gag. But it will be hard to top the sheer joy that was 'Fizbo.'" He also called Fizbo, the episode and the clown, the highlight of the season. The reception of Cameron and Mitchell led to the idea of a spin-off of the two titled Mitchell and Cam, although this ultimately never happened.

==== Accolades ====
In 2010, Eric Stonestreet was nominated for the Television Critics Association Award for Individual Achievement in Comedy. Stonestreet has won the Primetime Emmy Award for Outstanding Supporting Actor in a Comedy Series twice in 2010 and 2012. He was also nominated for the Golden Globe Award for Best Supporting Actor – Series, Miniseries, or Television Film in 2011, 2012, and 2013, along with receiving nominations for the Screen Actors Guild Award for Outstanding Performance by a Male Actor in a Comedy Series in 2011, 2012 and 2013. In 2011, along with Ed O'Neill and Ty Burrell, Stonestreet was nominated for the Critics' Choice Television Award for Best Supporting Actor in a Comedy Series.

=== Lily Tucker-Pritchett ===
Lily Tucker-Pritchett
- First appearance: "Pilot"; 1x01, September 23, 2009
- Last appearance: "Finale"; 11x17 & 11x18, April 8, 2020
- Portrayed by: Jaden and Ella Hiller (seasons 1 & 2); Aubrey Anderson-Emmons (seasons 3–11)

In-universe information
- Full name: Lily Elizabeth Tucker-Pritchett
- Gender: Female
- Occupation: Student
- Family: Mitchell Pritchett (adoptive father); Cameron Tucker (adoptive father); Rexford Tucker-Pritchett (adoptive brother)
- Relatives: Jay Pritchett (adoptive grandfather); DeDe Williams (adoptive grandmother; deceased); Gloria Delgado-Pritchett (adoptive step-grandmother); Merle Tucker (adoptive grandfather); Barbara "Barb" Jammy Tucker (adoptive grandmother); Joe Pritchett (adoptive half uncle); Claire Dunphy (adoptive aunt); Pameron "Pam" Jessica Tucker (adoptive aunt); Calhoun Johnson (adoptive cousin); Haley Dunphy (adoptive cousin); Alex Dunphy (adoptive cousin); Luke Dunphy (adoptive cousin); Dylan Marshall (adoptive cousin-in-law); George Marshall (adoptive first cousin once removed); Poppy Marshall (adoptive first cousin once removed); Phil Dunphy (adoptive uncle by marriage); Manny Delgado (adoptive step-uncle)
- Nationality: Vietnamese-American

Lily Elizabeth Tucker-Pritchett (Jaden and Ella Hiller seasons 1 and 2; Aubrey Anderson-Emmons seasons 3 to 11) is the adopted daughter of Cameron and Mitchell. They named her after the daughter of Charlotte from the HBO series Sex and the City and Cam's pig "Aunt Lily". In the show's early seasons, Cameron often dressed her up as famous people for photoshoots, such as Diana Ross, Olivia Newton-John, Madonna and Stevie Wonder. Cameron and Mitchell practiced the Ferber method on Lily when she was a baby, which prescribes allowing a baby to cry for a predetermined amount of time before intervening, though Cameron had difficulty fulling committing to this, even watching movies with her like Scarface, which he believes she likes because of the bright colors, particularly the club shooting scene. In the first two seasons, she was portrayed by twins Ella Hiller and Jaden Hiller. By season three, the twins "retired," their mother stating they did not enjoy acting. The role was recast with Aubrey Anderson-Emmons, who is older, and who uttered the character's first lines.

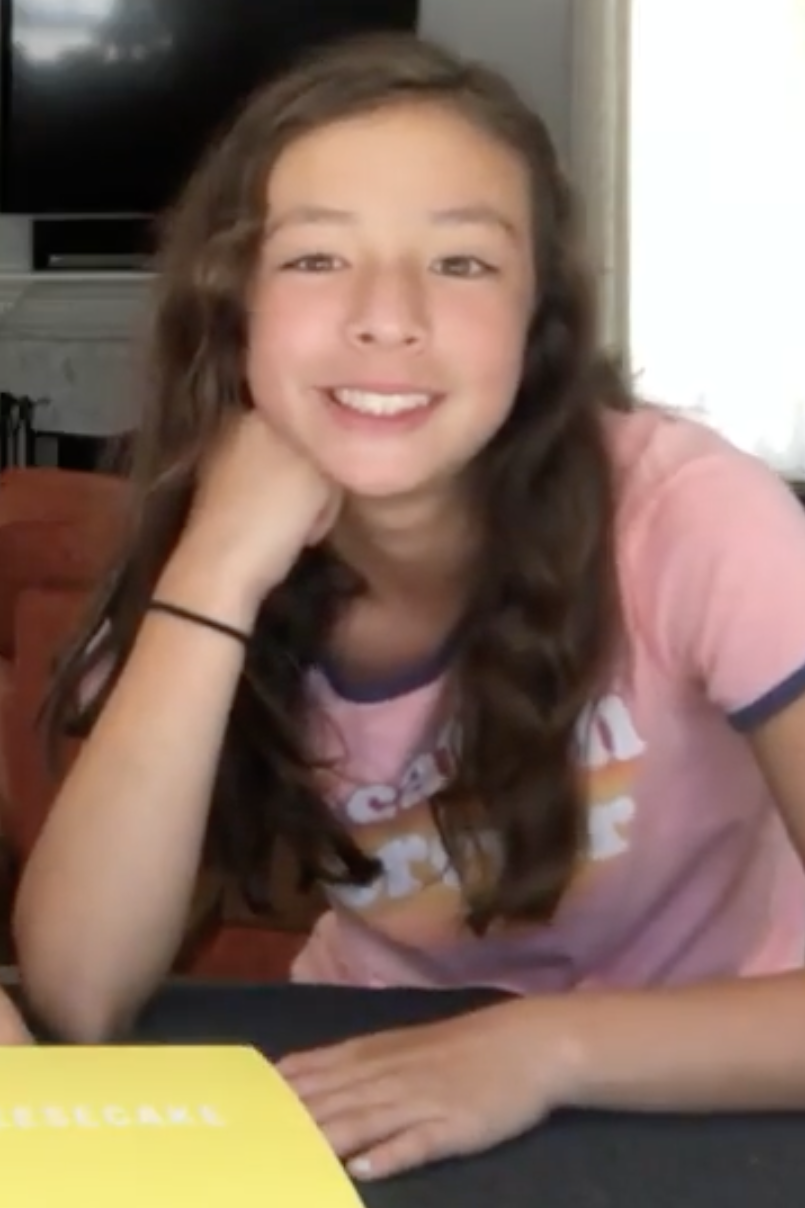
Aubrey Anderson-Emmons portrayed Lily Tucker-Pritchett, the adoptive daughter of Cam and Mitchell.

As she grows, Lily develops a sarcastic personality, in contrast to her expressive and sentimental parents. In contrast to her dads, she is not very chatty but when she does speak she is unafraid to speak her mind, no matter how impolite her thoughts may be.

Lily's stable personality and dry humor is there to balance the dramatic antics of her fathers and she constantly helps them see the light and find some common ground, like helping calm her parents when they adopted her baby brother Rexford. Lily had the alter ego of "Lizbo" to her dad Cam's "Fizbo" but in the end dropped it as she was tired of it. Lily is often the odd one out at school and wants to fit in; scenes are shown making the viewer aware of her different cultural/race background to her dads and her straight sexuality. However, as a 12 year old she finds that as well as having embarrassing parents, her dads' insights into boys helps her friends during a sleepover.

=== Larry ===
Larry is the pet cat of Lily, Cameron, and Mitchell. They adopt him in "Bringing Up Baby" (season 4, episode 1) after Cameron and Mitchell failed to adopt a second child.

== Other family members ==
=== Overview ===
Additional cast and characters from Modern Family
Actor	Character	Season										
Actor	Character	1	2	3	4	5	6	7	8	9	10	11
Shelley Long	DeDe Pritchett	Guest	Guest		Guest			Guest	Guest	Recurring	Guest	
Fred Willard	Frank Dunphy	Recurring			Recurring	Recurring	Guest		Recurring	Guest	Guest	Guest
Benjamin Bratt	Javier Delgado	Guest		Recurring	Guest		Guest		Guest			Guest
Elizabeth Banks	Sal	Guest			Guest	Recurring	Guest		Guest			Guest
Kevin Daniels	Longinus		Recurring	Guest	Guest	Recurring	Recurring	Guest		Guest		Recurring
Nathan Lane	Pepper Saltzman		Recurring		Guest	Recurring	Guest	Guest		Guest	Guest	
Spenser McNeil	Reuben Rand		Guest		Recurring	Recurring		Recurring	Guest			
Philip Baker Hall	Walt Kleezak		Guest	Recurring								
Celia Weston	Barb Tucker		Guest			Recurring			Guest			
David Cross	Duane Bailey			Recurring								
Barry Corbin	Merle Tucker			Guest		Recurring						
Rob Riggle	Gil Thorpe				Recurring	Guest	Guest		Guest	Guest	Guest	Guest
Adam DeVine	Andy Bailey					Recurring	Recurring	Recurring		Guest		
Christian Barillas	Ronaldo					Recurring	Guest	Guest	Guest	Recurring	Recurring	Recurring
Andrew Daly	Principal Brown					Recurring	Recurring		Recurring		Recurring	
Dana Powell	Pam Tucker					Recurring		Guest	Recurring	Recurring	Guest	
Arden Belle	Rhonda					Recurring						
Laura Ashley Samuels	Beth						Recurring	Recurring				
Brooke Sorenson	Tammy LaFontaine						Recurring	Guest				
Aubree Young	Sydney Barrow						Recurring	Guest				
Steve Zahn	Ronnie						Recurring					
Andrea Anders	Amber LaFontaine						Recurring					
Suraj Partha	Sanjay Patel						Guest	Recurring				
Jon Polito/Robert Costanzo	Earl Chambers						Guest	Recurring	Guest			
Joe Mande	Ben						Guest	Recurring	Recurring	Recurring		
Nathan Fillion	Rainer Shine								Recurring	Guest		
Chris Geere	Arvin Fennerman									Recurring	Recurring	Recurring
Jimmy Tatro	Bill									Guest	Recurring	Guest
Marcello Julian Reyes	Cal										Recurring	

=== DeDe Pritchett ===
DeDe Pritchett
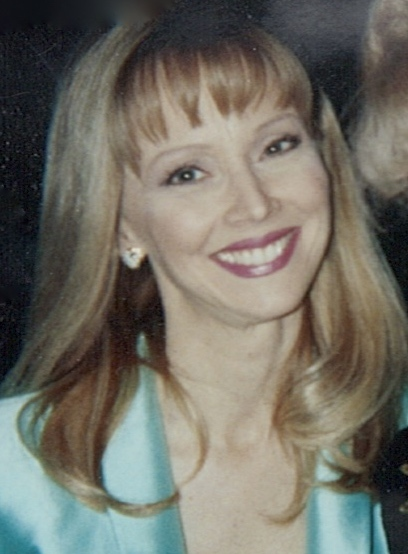
- First appearance: "The Incident"; 1x04, October 14, 2009
- Last appearance: "Good Grief"; 10x05, October 24, 2018
- Portrayed by: Shelley Long

In-universe information
- Full name: DeDe Williams-Pritchett
- Gender: Female
- Family: Lucas Williams (father; deceased); BeBe Williams (sister); CeCe Williams (sister)
- Spouses: Jay Pritchett (m. 1968; div. 2003) Jerry (m. 2016)
- Significant others: Chaz; Robbie Sullivan; Carl
- Children: Claire Dunphy (daughter); Mitchell Pritchett (son)
- Relatives: Haley Dunphy (granddaughter); Alex Dunphy (granddaughter); Luke Dunphy (grandson); Lily Tucker-Pritchett (adoptive granddaughter); Rexford Tucker-Pritchett (adoptive grandson); George Marshall (great-grandson); Poppy Marshall (great-granddaughter); Phil Dunphy (son-in-law); Cameron Tucker (son-in-law); Dylan Marshall (grandson-in-law); Donnie Pritchett (ex-brother-in-law); Becky Pritchett (ex-sister-in-law)

DeDe Pritchett (Shelley Long) is Claire and Mitchell's mother, Haley, Alex and Luke's maternal grandmother and one of the grandmothers of Lily and Rexford, Phil and Cam's mother-in-law, and Jay's ex-wife. It is implied that she might be mentally ill due to her somewhat manipulative and sometimes aggressive ways. It is implied that she was initially more accepting of Mitchell's sexual orientation than Jay was when he first came out. She often uses her close relationship with Mitchell to get him to do things he does not want to do. Jay wanted to divorce her after a spectacular fight they had while their kids were still in school (he taped over an episode of Dallas to record an NFL game that, ironically, featured the Dallas Cowboys) but was inspired by an animatronic Abraham Lincoln exhibit at Disneyland to stick things out until Claire and Mitchell reached adulthood. She is still bitter over Jay's remarriage to Gloria and even attempted to ruin their wedding, which she convinced Mitchell to talk Jay and Gloria into inviting her to; she got drunk and made rude and inappropriate toasts and eventually had to be dragged out of the reception, in the process ruining the wedding cake. She is very aggressive towards Gloria, often trying to attack her physically. DeDe is also passive-aggressive toward Cameron about his weight and is often critical of Claire, especially her appearance. She also seems to be terrific friends with Manny as they write letters to each other talking about their issues. DeDe is also a famous author and poet. A running gag throughout the series is that DeDe's arrival is always forewarned by bad omens (birds crashing into the window or peaceful scenarios spontaneously turning chaotic).

Her relationship with Gloria becomes more strained in Season 1 when she wants to apologize to her for the wedding fiasco but ends up physically attacking her saying she can't be nice to her. But this relationship improved in the episode "Arrested". of Season 4. When DeDe sees that Gloria is pregnant, she finds it hilarious that Jay's marriage to a much younger trophy wife has forced him to raise a child in his 60s. She found a new sympathy for Gloria, and the two bonded over Jay-bashing when DeDe tells Gloria that she was always the one having to change diapers, clean spit-up, and buy things for the baby. Gloria, in turn, found a new sympathy for DeDe, suggesting that her lack of support from Jay was what caused her to become "so crazy".

In the season 10 episode, "Good Grief", which takes place on Halloween, DeDe dies peacefully in her sleep while on a trip with her women's group.

=== Frank Dunphy ===
Frank Dunphy
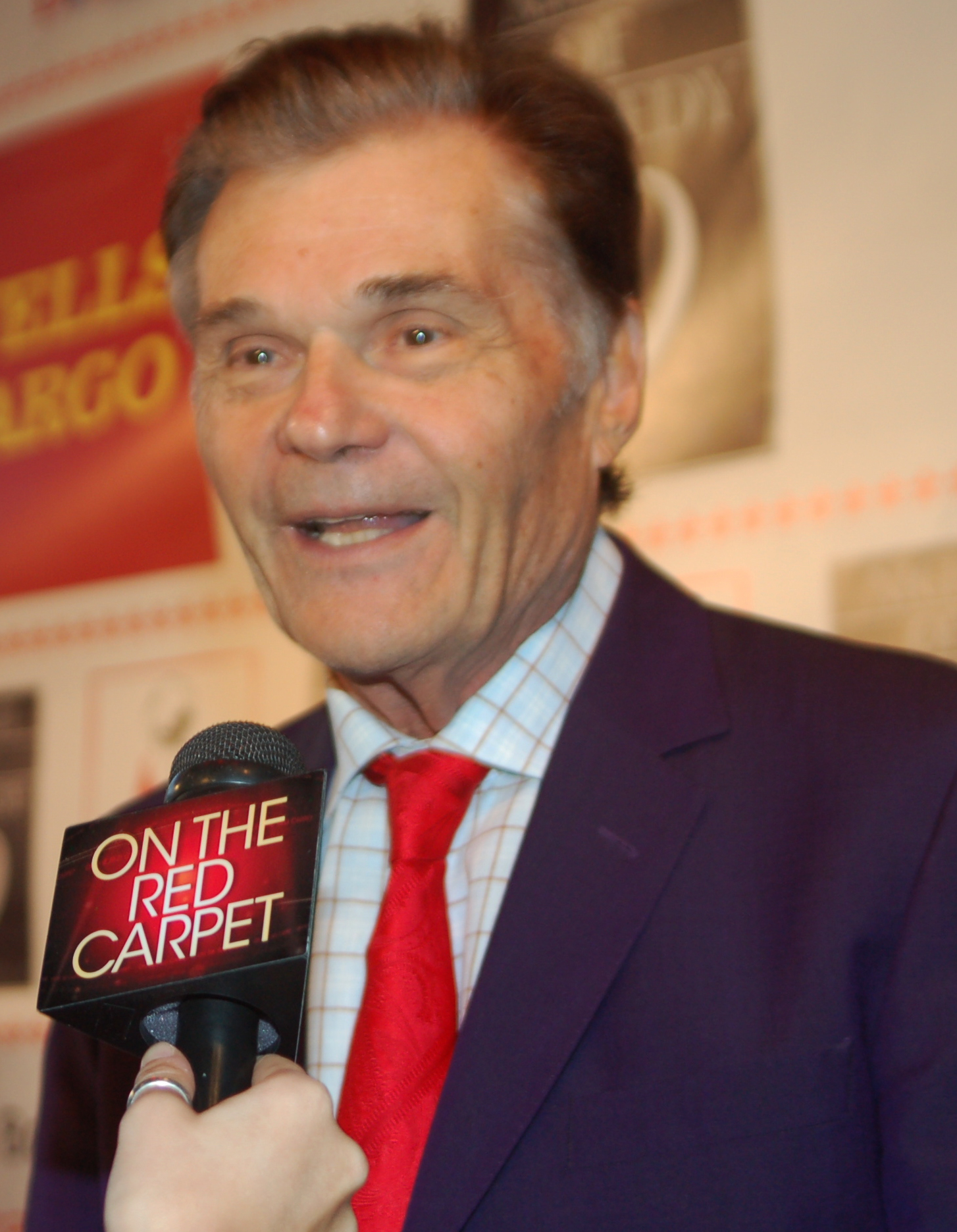
- First appearance: "Undeck the Halls"; 1x10, December 9, 2009
- Last appearance: "Legacy"; 11x11, January 15, 2020
- Portrayed by: Fred Willard

In-universe information
- Full name: Franklin Bernard Dunphy
- Gender: Male
- Spouses: Grace Dunphy (died 2013) Lorraine Dunphy (m. 2017)
- Children: Phil Dunphy (son); Ray (stepson)
- Relatives: Haley Dunphy (granddaughter); Alex Dunphy (granddaughter); Luke Dunphy (grandson); George Marshall (great-grandson); Poppy Marshall (great-granddaughter); Claire Dunphy (daughter-in-law); Dylan Marshall (grandson-in-law)

Francis Allen "Frank" Dunphy (Fred Willard) is Phil's father and Haley, Alex and Luke's paternal grandfather. On Christmas, the family shared a webcam chat with him.

Frank returns in "Travels with Scout" when he travels cross country without Phil's mother and shows up with a dog that he says she has allergies to. He ends up taking the dog back with him. Frank is kind of a polar opposite of Jay's (Claire's father) grumpiness and dry manner, as he is seen being laid back, funny and cool most of the time. Claire mentions this in "Closet, You'll Love it!" when most family members refer to Jay as 'Grump-pa' while Frank is referred to as 'Fun-pa.' His attitude is a near carbon copy of Phil's personality. At the end of season 4, it is revealed that Frank's wife (Phil's mother) had died. In season 8, Frank starts dating Lorraine, Phil's childhood babysitter and crush. Later, he proposes to her, and in episode 19, they get married.

In the episode "Legacy," Phil visits Frank in Florida after hearing some concerning news about him, and then at the end of the episode, Frank dies.

In 2010, Willard was nominated for the Primetime Emmy Award for Outstanding Guest Actor in a Comedy Series.

=== Javier Delgado ===
Javier Delgado
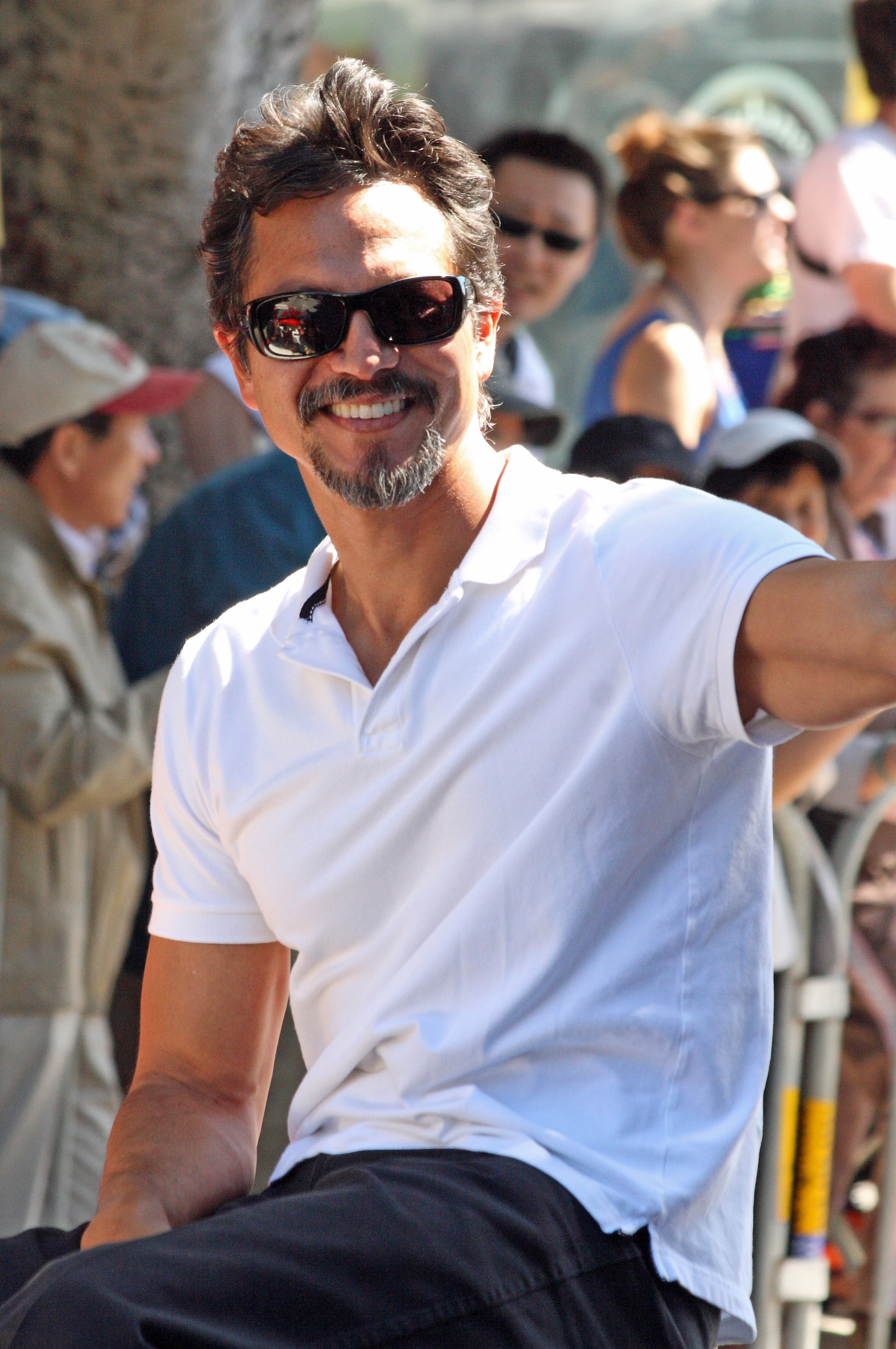
- First appearance: "Up All Night"; 1x11, January 6, 2010
- Last appearance: "Dead on a Rival"; 11x12, January 22, 2020
- Portrayed by: Benjamin Bratt

In-universe information
- Full name: Javier Hectoro Delgado
- Gender: Male
- Spouse: Gloria Ramirez (m. 1995; div. 2002)
- Significant other: Trish (fiancée)
- Children: Manny Delgado (son)
- Relatives: Fulgencio Ramírez (ex-father-in-law; deceased); Pilar Ramírez (ex-mother-in-law); Sonia Ramírez (ex-sister-in-law)
- Nationality: Colombian

Javier Delgado (Benjamin Bratt) is Manny's biological father and Gloria's ex-husband. He and Gloria were divorced; in the pilot, Gloria says all they did was "fight and make love," at one point leading them to fall out of a window. Manny looks up to him, but Javier always lets him down, while Jay is left downcast by the reminders that Manny has another dad. He is oddly gifted when it comes to betting on horse racing. In the episode "Flip Flop," he has a girlfriend named Trish (Paget Brewster) and almost marries her.

Javier was formerly a Triple-A baseball player and played alongside such baseball greats as Sammy Sosa and Mark McGwire. He has many connections to matadors and baseball players. He and Jay became close, but Javier lets Jay down just as he does Manny.

=== Barb Tucker ===
Barb Tucker
- First appearance: "Mother Tucker"; 2x09, November 24, 2010
- Portrayed by: Celia Weston

In-universe information
- Full name: Barbara Jammy Tucker
- Gender: Female
- Spouse: Merle Tucker
- Children: Cameron Tucker (son); Pam Tucker (daughter); 2 other unnamed children
- Relatives: Lily Tucker-Pritchett (adoptive granddaughter); Rexford Tucker-Pritchett (adoptive grandson); Calhoun Johnson (grandson)

Barb Tucker (Celia Weston) is Cameron's mother. She first appeared in the episode "Mother Tucker". In that episode, she visits Cameron and Mitchell. While Cameron earnestly declares that his mother is wonderful, Mitchell is less sure because she has a habit of touching Mitchell inappropriately. When Mitchell finally tells Cameron about this, Barb happens to walk in on them and hears his complaints. Later, she apologizes to Mitchell. Unfortunately, she does this while he is in the bathtub. In "The Wedding", she attends her son's wedding to Mitchell and almost ends it with Merle, but Jay and Gloria manage to reconcile the two.

=== Donnie Pritchett ===
Donnie Pritchett
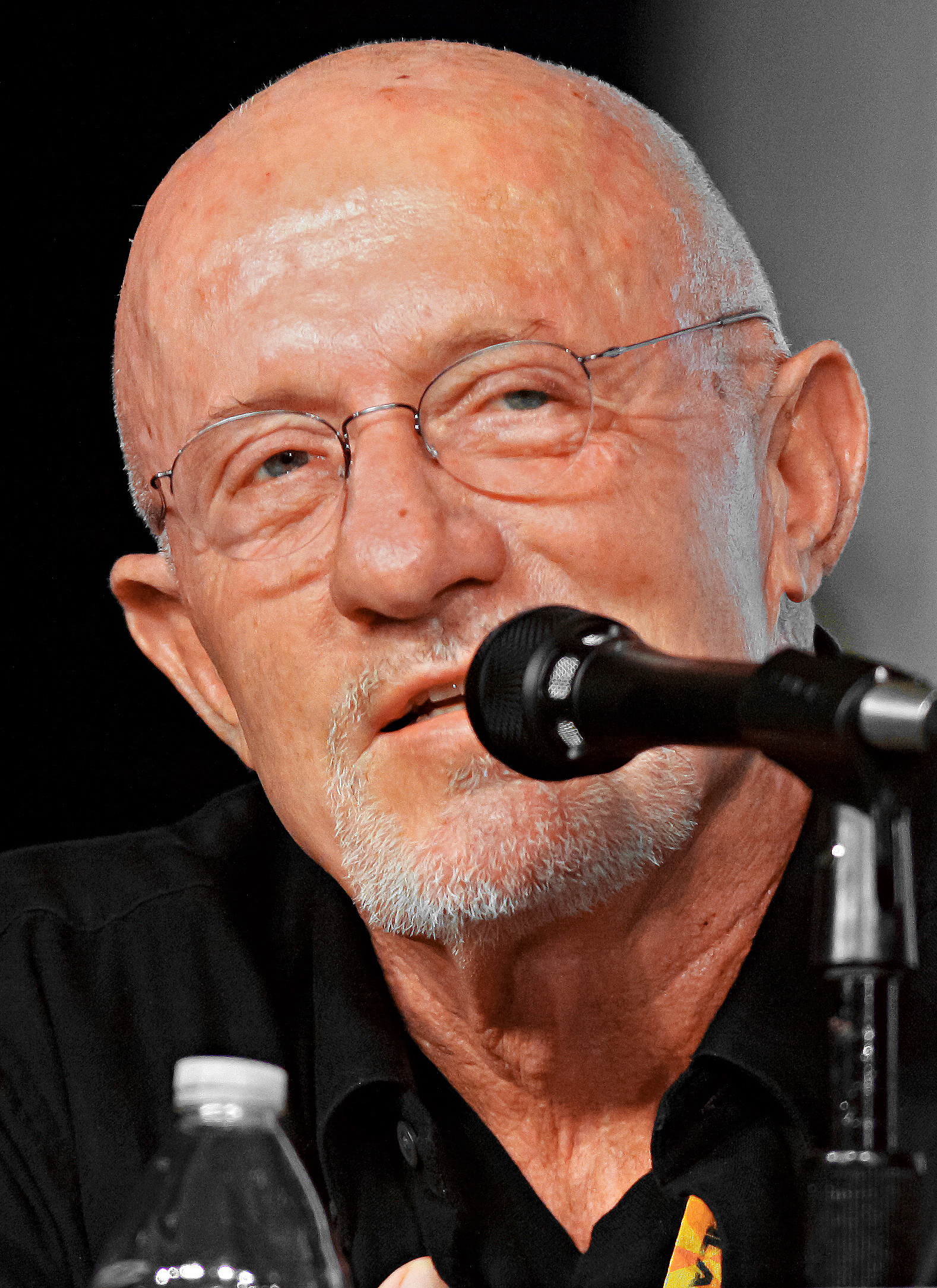
- First appearance: "The Musical Man"; 2x19, April 13, 2011
- Portrayed by: Jonathan Banks

In-universe information
- Full name: Donald Arlen Pritchett
- Gender: Male
- Family: Jay Pritchett (brother); Becky Pritchett (sister)
- Spouse: Irene Pritchett
- Children: Michael Pritchett (son); Possibly more children
- Relatives: Melanie Pritchett (granddaughter); Possibly more grandchildren Claire Dunphy (niece); Mitchell Pritchett (nephew); Joe Pritchett (nephew); Haley Dunphy (grandniece); Alex Dunphy (grandniece); Luke Dunphy (grandnephew); Lily Tucker-Pritchett (adoptive grandniece); Rexford Tucker-Pritchett (adoptive grandnephew); Phil Dunphy (nephew-in-law); Cameron Tucker (nephew-in-law); Gloria Delgado-Pritchett (sister-in-law); DeDe Williams (ex-sister-in-law); Manny Delgado (step-nephew); Dylan Marshall (grandnephew-in-law); George Marshall (great-grandnephew); Poppy Marshall (great-grandniece)

Donnie Pritchett (Jonathan Banks) is Jay's brother. He first appeared in the episode "The Musical Man" where he visits Jay, and they soon start bickering, and later, Jay finds out he has cancer.

He attends Luke and Manny's musical, and there he and Jay share an emotional moment.

=== Merle Tucker ===
Merle Stonewall Tucker
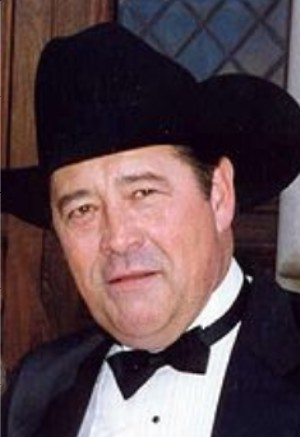
- Barry Corbin
- First appearance: "The Last Walt"; 3x20, April 18, 2012
- Portrayed by: Barry Corbin

In-universe information
- Full name: Merlen Stonewall Tucker
- Gender: Male
- Spouse: Barb Tucker
- Children: Cameron Tucker (son); Pam Tucker (daughter); 2 other unnamed children
- Relatives: Lily Tucker-Pritchett (adoptive granddaughter); Rexford Tucker-Pritchett (adoptive grandson); Calhoun Johnson (grandson)

Merle Tucker (Barry Corbin) is Cameron's father. He first appeared in the episode "The Last Walt." In that episode, he visits Cameron and Mitchell. Later in the episode, it is revealed that Jay (Mitchell's father) and Merle dislike each other. Cameron and Mitchell each believe that their father is the stronger of the two. It is made known that Merle wishes that the man his son lives with was "A little bit of a woman". Jay and Merle overcome their differences and bond while fixing the bed frame that Cameron had purchased and attempted to put together. In "The Wedding", he attends his son's wedding to Mitchell and almost ends it with Barb, but Jay and Gloria manage to reconcile the two.

=== Pilar Ramírez ===
Pilar
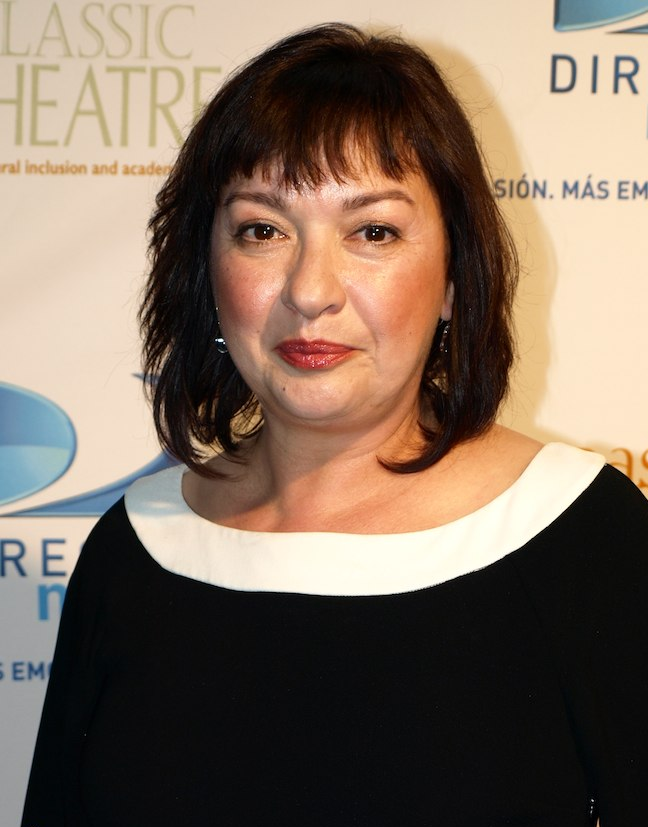
- First appearance: "Fulgencio"; 4x13, January 23, 2013
- Portrayed by: Elizabeth Peña

In-universe information
- Full name: Pilar Ana-Maria Rosa de la Immaculada Ramirez
- Gender: Female
- Family: Umberto Morales (father; deceased); Ana-Maria Rosa de la Immaculada Jimenez Morales (mother; deceased)
- Spouse: Fulgencio Ramírez (deceased)
- Children: Gloria Pritchett (daughter); Sonia Ramírez (daughter); 2 unnamed sons
- Relatives: Manny Delgado (grandson); Joe Pritchett (grandson); Jay Pritchett (son-in-law); Javier Delgado (ex-son-in-law); Claire Dunphy (step-granddaughter); Mitchell Pritchett (step-grandson); Phil Dunphy (step-grandson-in-law); Cameron Tucker-Pritchett (step-grandson-in-law); Haley Dunphy (step-great-granddaughter); Alex Dunphy (step-great-granddaughter); Luke Dunphy (step-great-grandson); Lily Tucker-Pritchett (adoptive step-great-granddaughter); Rexford Tucker-Pritchett (adoptive step-great-grandson); Dylan Marshall (step-great-grandson-in-law); George Marshall (step-great-great-grandson); Poppy Marshall (step-great-great-granddaughter)
- Nationality: Colombian

Pilar Ramirez (Elizabeth Peña) is Gloria's mother. She first appeared in the episode "Fulgencio". In that episode, she and her other daughter, Sonia, visit Jay and Gloria shortly after their son Joe is born. She reveals that she never liked Jay and wants to name Joe after her husband and father (Fulgencio Umberto).

In "The Old Man & the Tree", she visits her daughter for Christmas and appears to treat Claire more as a daughter than Gloria after taking a liking to Claire.

=== Sonia Ramirez ===
Sonia
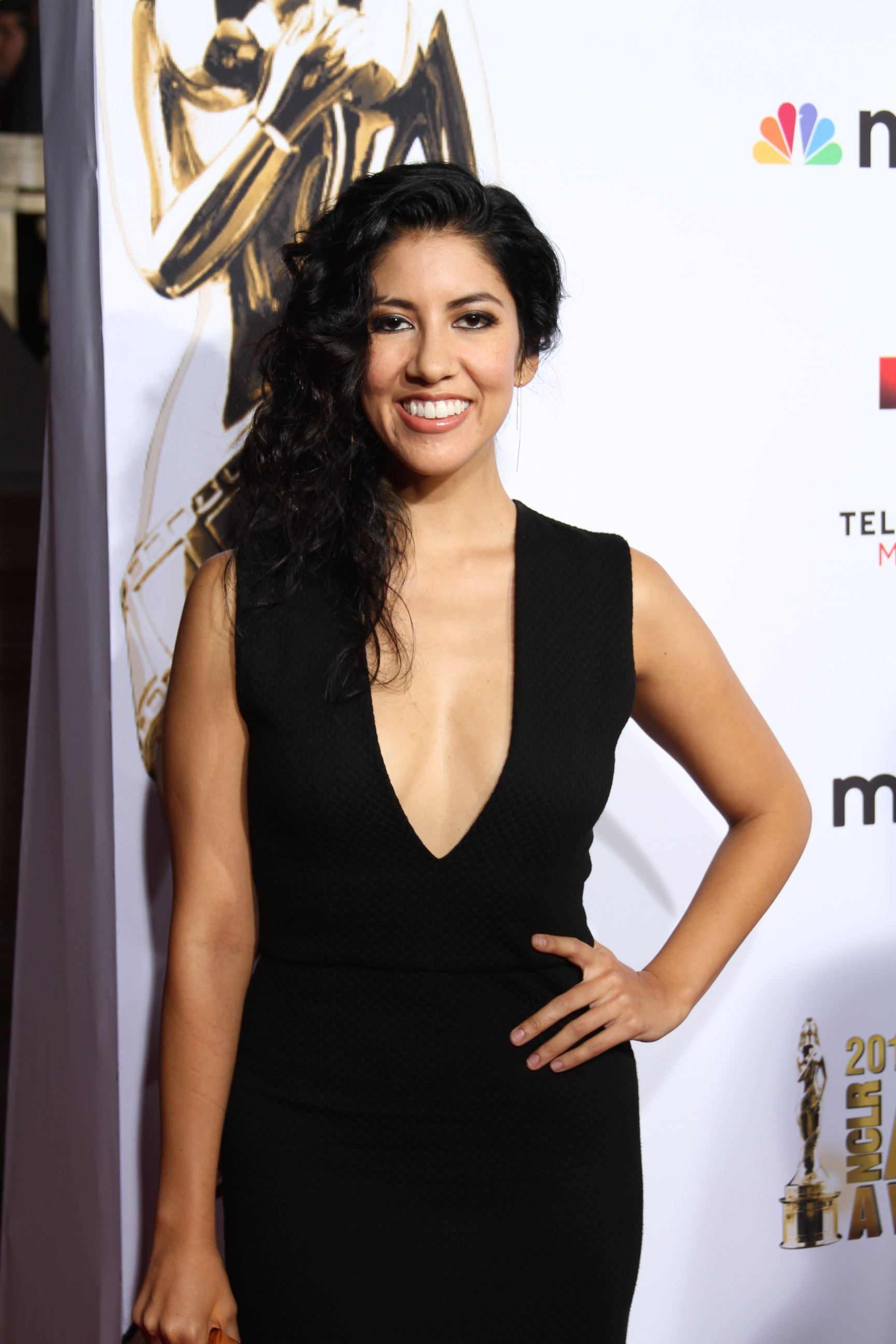
- First appearance: "Fulgencio"; 4x13, January 23, 2013
- Portrayed by: Stephanie Beatriz

In-universe information
- Full name: Sonia Ana-Maria Ramirez
- Gender: Female
- Family: Fulgencio Ramirez (father; deceased); Pilar Ramirez (mother); Gloria Pritchett (sister); 2 unnamed brothers
- Relatives: Umberto Morales (grandfather; deceased); Ana-Maria Rosa de la Immaculada Jimenez Morales (grandmother; deceased); Manny Delgado (nephew); Joe Pritchett (nephew); Jay Pritchett (brother-in-law); Javier Delgado (ex-brother-in-law); Claire Dunphy (step-niece); Mitchell Pritchett (step-nephew); Phil Dunphy (step-nephew-in-law); Cameron Tucker-Pritchett (step-nephew-in-law); Haley Dunphy (step-grandniece); Dylan Marshall (step-grandnephew-in-law); Alex Dunphy (step-grandniece); Luke Dunphy (step-grandnephew); Lily Tucker-Pritchett (adoptive step-grandniece); Rexford Tucker-Pritchett (adoptive step-grandnephew); George Marshall (step-great-grandnephew); Poppy Marshall (step-great-grandniece)
- Nationality: Colombian

Sonia Ramirez (Stephanie Beatriz) is Gloria's sister. She first appeared in the episode "Fulgencio". In that episode, she and her mother, Pilar, visit Jay and Gloria shortly after their son Joe is born. She appears to be wanting to get out of Colombia after a flood occurred there. Later, at Joe's christening, she and Gloria get into a fight over how Jay originally liked Sonia, not Gloria.

She returns in "Valentine's Day 4: Twisted Sister", she visits her sister and her family and tries to make a move on Jay because she is still infatuated with him. She then tries to get Gloria out of the picture, and when Jay tells Gloria, she doesn't believe him. Jay goes to his room to apologize to Sonia, and then she tries to make a move on him there, only to be heard via a baby monitor and then Gloria enters and realizes Jay was right and the sisters resume fighting over him.

=== Pam Tucker ===
Pam Tucker
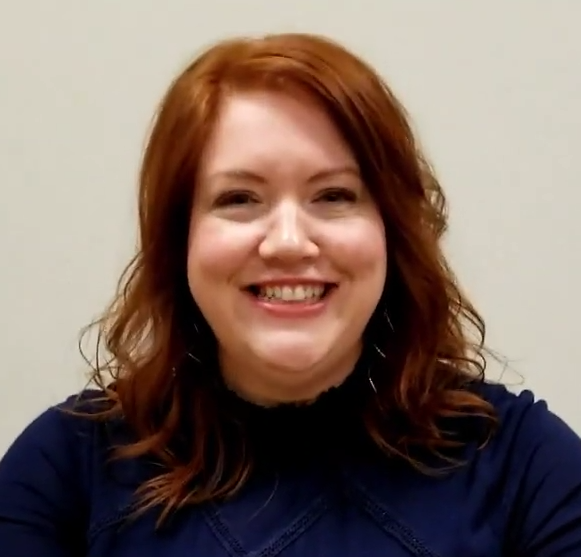
- First appearance: "Farm Strong"; 5x04, October 9, 2013
- Portrayed by: Dana Powell

In-universe information
- Full name: Pameron Jessica Tucker
- Gender: Female
- Family: Merle Tucker (father); Barb Tucker (mother); Cameron Tucker-Pritchett (brother); 2 unnamed siblings
- Spouse: Bo Johnson (divorced)
- Children: Calhoun "Cal" Tucker (son)
- Relatives: Pat (aunt); Lily Tucker-Pritchett (adoptive niece); Rexford Tucker-Pritchett (adoptive nephew); Mitchell Pritchett (brother-in-law)

Pameron Jessica "Pam" Tucker (Dana Powell) is Cameron's older sister.

In "Farm Strong," she comes for a visit from the farm, and Mitchell and Cameron are afraid to tell her that they are getting married because they do not want to hurt her feelings about her still being single and because Cameron claims that Pam is compassionate. Lily is the one who finally tells her. Pam seems extremely happy with the news and shares her news with them; she is engaged to Cameron's first crush, Bo Johnson. Cameron gets upset hearing that, and Pam tells him that no one in the family wanted to tell him because he is too sensitive. They were protecting him, something that contradicts Cameron's earlier assertion and makes Cameron even more upset. When the whole family gathers at Jay and Gloria's house, Cameron wants to prove that he is not that sensitive as Pam accuses him and asks everyone to tell him things they were hiding from him because they were trying to protect him. Everyone says their part, and Cameron, as much as he tries not to break down in tears, after hearing Lily admitting that she pretends to fall asleep when he reads to her so he can leave her alone, breaks down in tears and finishes locking himself in the bathroom. Mitchell and Pam comfort him, and Pam tells him that he may have difficulty with bad news, but everyone always wants to share the good news with him because he would still appreciate it.

In "The Wedding," she has small cameos at Mitchell and Cameron's wedding.

In "Frank's wedding," she comes to visit and auditions for a modeling job. By the end of the episode, it is revealed that she is looking for jobs to better take care of herself, as she is revealed to be pregnant, which is hidden by her body and weight. She goes into labor at the house and has her baby.

=== Becky Pritchett ===
Becky Pritchett
- First appearance: "The Escape"; 9x21, May 9, 2018
- Portrayed by: Mary Louise Wilson

In-universe information
- Full name: Rebecca Valerie Pritchett
- Gender: Female
- Family: Jay Pritchett (brother); Donnie Pritchett (brother)
- Spouse: Unnamed husband (deceased)
- Children: Brian (son)
- Relatives: Claire Dunphy (niece); Mitchell Pritchett (nephew); Joe Pritchett (nephew); Haley Dunphy (grandniece); Alex Dunphy (grandniece); Luke Dunphy (grandnephew); Lily Tucker-Pritchett (adoptive grandniece); Rexford Tucker-Pritchett (adoptive grandnephew); Michael Pritchett (nephew); Melanie Pritchett (grandniece); Phil Dunphy (nephew-in-law); Cameron Tucker (nephew-in-law) unnamed niece-in-law Gloria Pritchett (sister-in-law); Irene Pritchett (sister-in-law); DeDe Williams (ex-sister-in-law); Manny Delgado (step-nephew); George Marshall (great-grandnephew); Poppy Marshall (great-grandniece); Dylan Marshall (grandnephew-in-law)

Becky Pritchett (Mary Louise Wilson) is the sister of Jay Pritchett.

She is first mentioned in "The Kiss" when Jay tells everyone that his father only kissed him once his entire life. That was when he came up behind Jay, kissed him on the back of the head, and said "Goodnight, Becky," thinking he was his sister.

Becky has a son named Brian, and it is his wedding which Jay, DeDe, Claire, and Mitchell attend in the episode "Sarge & Pea".

Becky makes her first appearance in "The Escape,". It is revealed that Becky is a mean woman and kind of a monster. She and Jay have a troubled relationship and haven't spoken in 9 years. Gloria only met Becky once, at her and Jay's wedding. When Claire and Mitchell were kids, they were terrified of her.

Becky is in a nursing home, recovering from a stroke. Jay, Gloria, Mitchell, Cam, Claire, and Phil all pay Becky a visit. They enter her room to find her sleeping with the "same mean old puss on her face". After she awakes to find them there, a doctor comes in and tells the family that the stroke may have scrambled Becky's memories. She doesn't remember Mitchell coming out as gay and she asks Jay if she can borrow his fishing cabin for the coming summer. But this was her cabin. It had belonged to their father who told Jay he was leaving it to him. But instead, he left it to Becky.

Claire sees that Becky is wearing the necklace she loaned her to wear at Jay and Gloria's wedding and never returned. She told Claire she lost it. Now Becky tells them she got the necklace from a prince in Liechtenstein. Claire brings along Becky's favorite tomato soup and heats it up, hoping the smell will jog her memory.

In the end, Becky reveals that her memory is fine and the doctor who was tending to her is really just a friend named Fred from next door. He once played a doctor on a soap opera and kept the coat. Claire and Mitchell come back in and Claire attempts to fool Becky into returning the necklace by telling her that she just got off the phone with the prince of Liechtenstein who told her he's in financial trouble and needs the necklace back to feed his people. Then Jay reveals to Claire and Mitchell that there was nothing wrong with Becky's memory and she was messing with them. They are furious and Claire demands Becky return the necklace. But she refuses to give it back until Claire fixes the dent she put in Becky's car back in high school. And when Claire doesn't deny it, she keeps the necklace. In the final scene, Claire is waiting in the car when Phil rushes out with the necklace. He had gone back in, gave Becky a hug goodbye, used his sleight-of-hand, and retrieved the necklace on the third try. This made Claire very happy. As they are leaving, they see Becky coming up behind them on her motorized cart, telling them to give her that necklace.

== Other characters ==
=== Introduced in season 1 ===
==== Sal ====
Sal
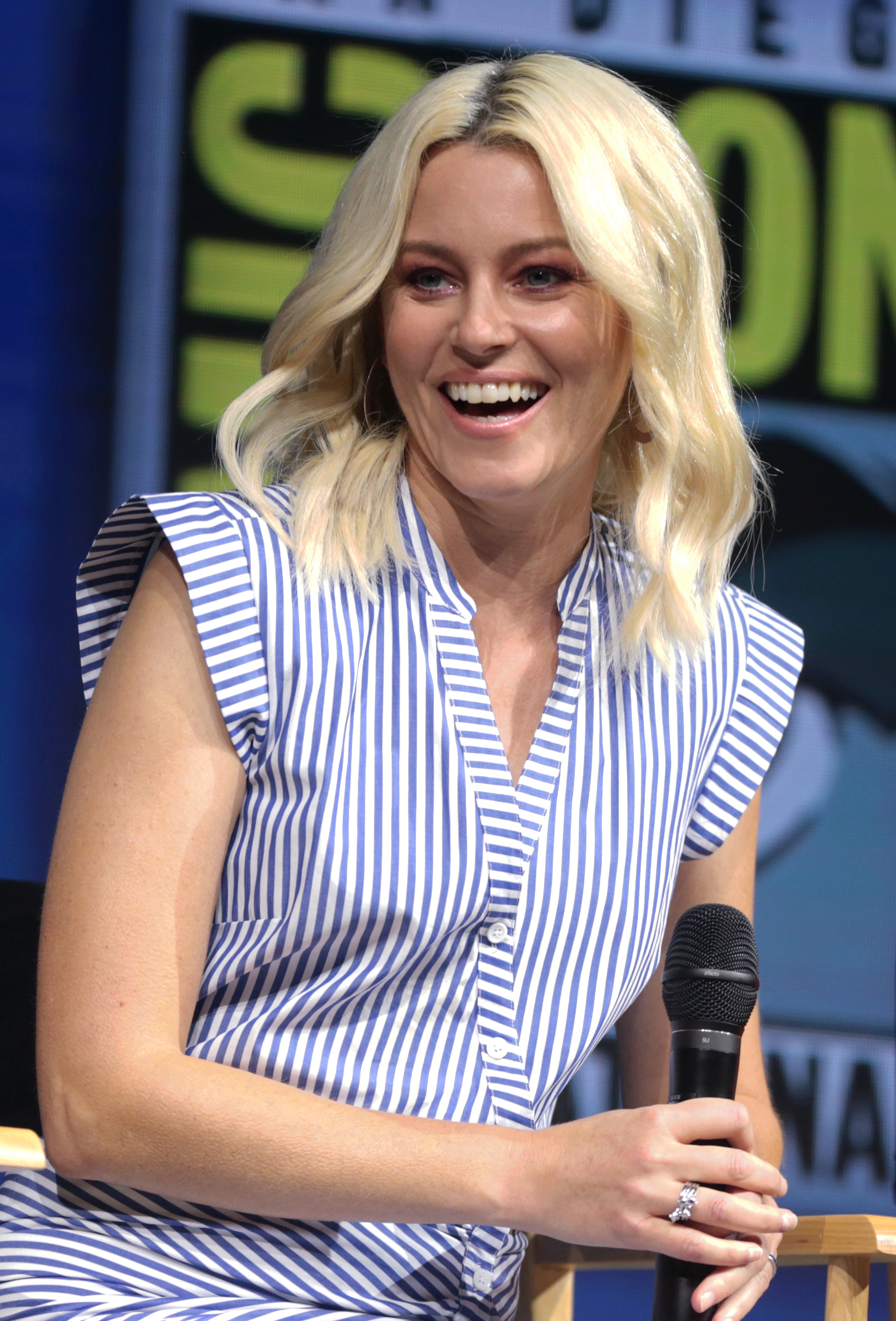
- First appearance: "Great Expectations"; 1x08, November 18, 2009
- Last appearance: "Finale"; 11x17 & 11x18, April 8, 2020
- Portrayed by: Elizabeth Banks

In-universe information
- Full name: Sally Swan
- Gender: Female
- Family: Sammy (son)
- Spouse: Tony (divorced)
- Significant other: Eddie (boyfriend)

Sal (Elizabeth Banks) is Mitch and Cameron's wild, partying, boozy friend from their younger years in the 1990s. In the episode "Great Expectations," she becomes very jealous of the attention Lily had been getting and threatens to kill her multiple times. In the episode "Best Men," she gets married and enlists Cam and Mitch to be the best men at the wedding. However, in the episode, "The Wedding (Part 1)" she tells them that she got divorced and she is pregnant. Sal had declared herself the officiator of the wedding while Cam and Mitch tried to intervene about her drinking. In "The Wedding (Part 2)", Sal's water breaks in the middle of the (first) ceremony. She convinces her new boyfriend of four months (who believes he is the father) that when a baby comes so early, sometimes it is black.

It eventually transpires (in "Fight or Flight") that Sal's baby is white, and she is raising the baby alone, having presumably split from the man she saw at the time of Mitch and Cameron's wedding. When Mitch, Cam, Pepper, and friends throw her a baby shower, she is seen as far more mature and responsible due to her baby's birth, despite everyone fearing the worst when she disappears in the middle of the party.

==== Vincent "Shorty" ====
Vincent
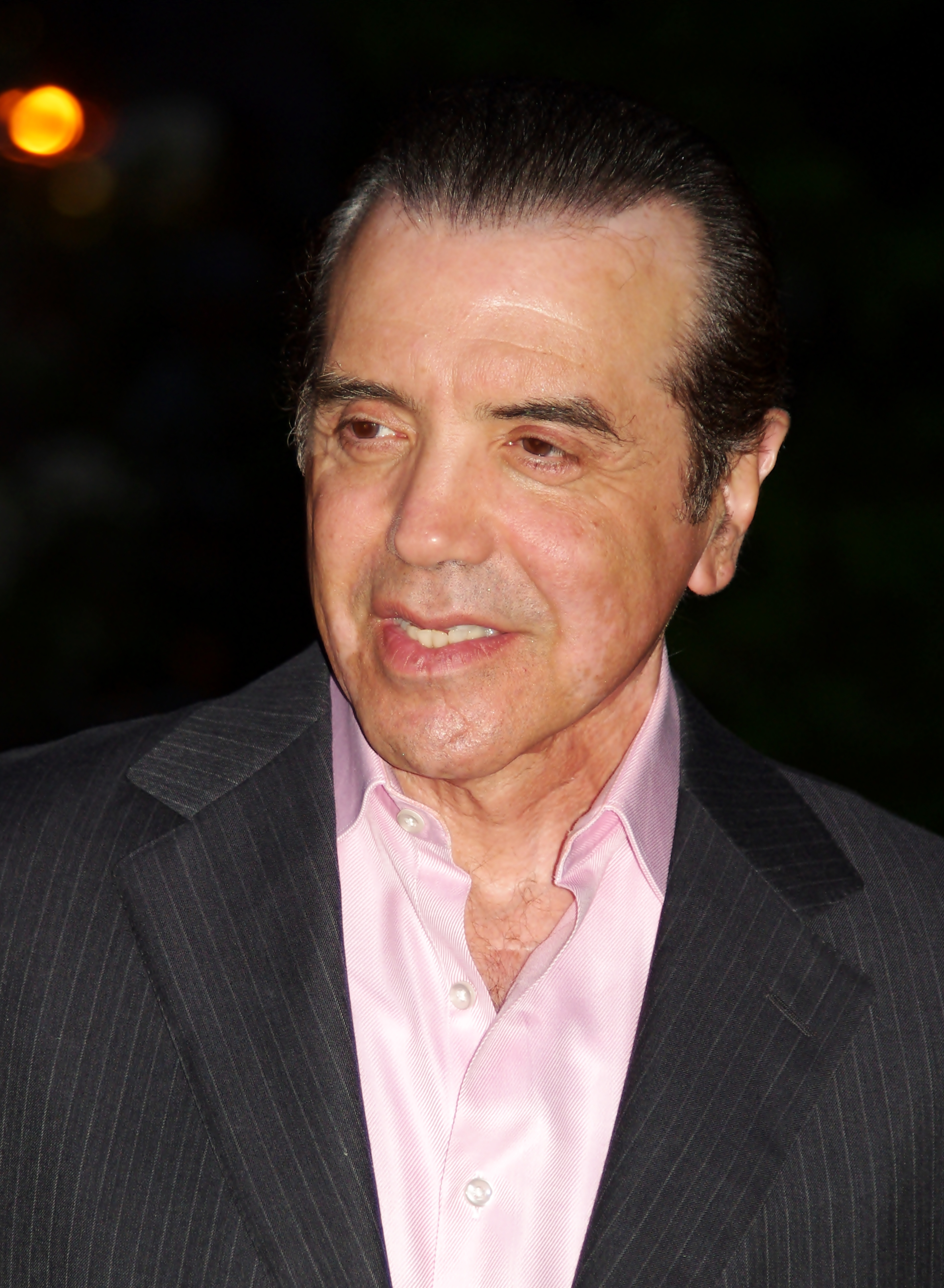
- First appearance: "Fifteen Percent"; 1x13, January 20, 2010
- Last appearance: "A Year of Birthdays"; 10x22, May 8, 2019
- Portrayed by: Chazz Palminteri

In-universe information
- Full name: Vincent Corsetti
- Nickname: Shorty
- Gender: Male
- Spouse: Darlene (divorced)

Vincent "Shorty" (Chazz Palminteri) is Jay's best friend. A stylish dresser and dancer, Jay says they were best friends for as long as he can remember. When Mitchell was born premature, Shorty visited Jay in the hospital and stayed for two days. In his honor, Jay gave Mitchell the middle name "Vincent".

In the episode "Fifteen Percent," Mitchell tricks Jay by telling him Shorty is gay. As a result, Jay agrees to cover Shorty's $20,000 debt to a bookie. In the episode "Treehouse," Jay and Gloria are having Shorty and his girlfriend Darlene (Jennifer Tilly) for dinner, and the next day the couples go Salsa dancing together. Shorty is part of Jay's birthday surprise in "Bringing Up Baby".

In "Three Dinners", Shorty and Darlene, now married, announce they are moving to Costa Rica. Jay struggles to come to terms with the move and fights with Shorty, but eventually they share an emotional goodbye. Shorty returns in "Sex, Lies and Kickball" and says he started a successful fruit juice business, but later confesses to Jay that his wife left him and that the business was a failure. Jay reassures him he'll help him get back on his feet. He performs in Jay's birthday roast in the episode "A Year of Birthdays".

=== Introduced in season 2 ===
==== Pepper Saltzman ====
Pepper Saltzman
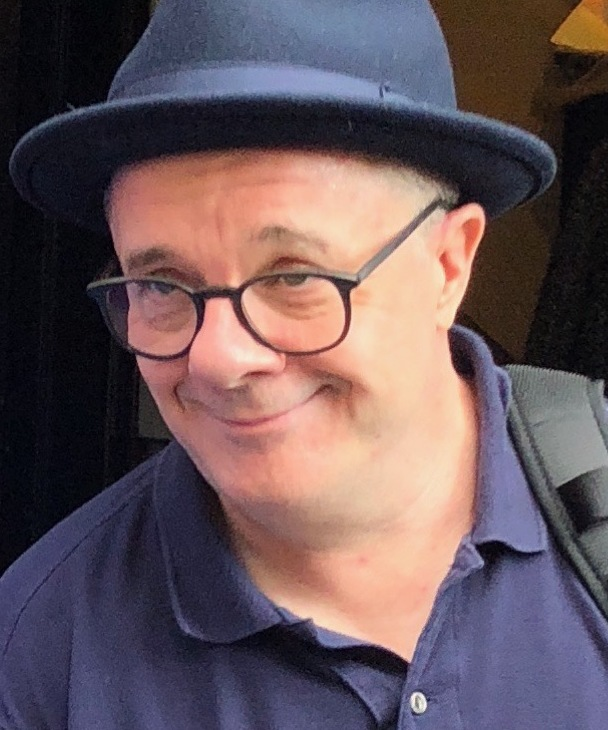
- First appearance: "Earthquake"; 2x03, October 6, 2010
- Last appearance: "We Need to Talk About Lily"; 10x14, January 30, 2019
- Portrayed by: Nathan Lane

In-universe information
- Full name: Sherman Chaim Saltzman
- Gender: Male
- Occupation: Wedding planner
- Family: Chaim Saltzman (father); Kyle Saltzman (son) Lionel Saltzman (Adoptive son)
- Spouse: Ronaldo

Sherman "Pepper" Saltzman (Nathan Lane) is one of Mitchell and Cameron's friends. Although he was referred to in the pilot episode and several times after that throughout the first season, Pepper first appeared on camera in the second season.

In "Earthquake," both Mitch and Cam hate going to Pepper's yearly party, and they decide to try and skip it this time. Since an earthquake happened, they say that Mitch has a sprained ankle and that stuff is broken all over the house as an excuse. Though none of their property had damaged the earthquake, Pepper invited himself over to their home to help. Not long after Pepper comes in, he starts to feel bad because Mitch told him that he does not want to go to the parties. After all, he gets jealous because of Pepper and Cam. He helps plan Mitchell and Cam's wedding.

In "Boys' Night", he hangs out with Mitch, Cam, Longines, Crispin, and Jay on their "boys' night out".

In "Fight or Flight", he, Mitch, Cam, Ronaldo, and Longines organize a belated baby shower for Sal.

In "I Don't Know How She Does It", he mentions his first name, Sherman, saying he has not used that name since he left Lubbock, Texas, decades ago.

==== Bethenny ====
Bethenny
- First appearance: "Dance Dance Revelation"; 2x10, December 8, 2010
- Last appearance: "Go Bullfrogs!"; 3x06, October 19, 2011
- Portrayed by: Artemis Pebdani

In-universe information
- Gender: Female
- Occupation: Unknown

Bethenny (Artemis Pebdani) is a friend of Claire Dunphy's. In "Dance Dance Revelation," she helps Claire, Gloria, and other mothers organize Luke and Manny's middle school dance.

In "Go Bullfrogs!" she is seen along with Holly and her friend at Holly's house when Claire gives Luke his retainer.

In "Disneyland," it is revealed that she has a nephew, Ethan, whom Claire invites to go to Disneyland with the rest of the family because she wants her daughter Haley to fall for him.

==== Longinus ====
Longinus
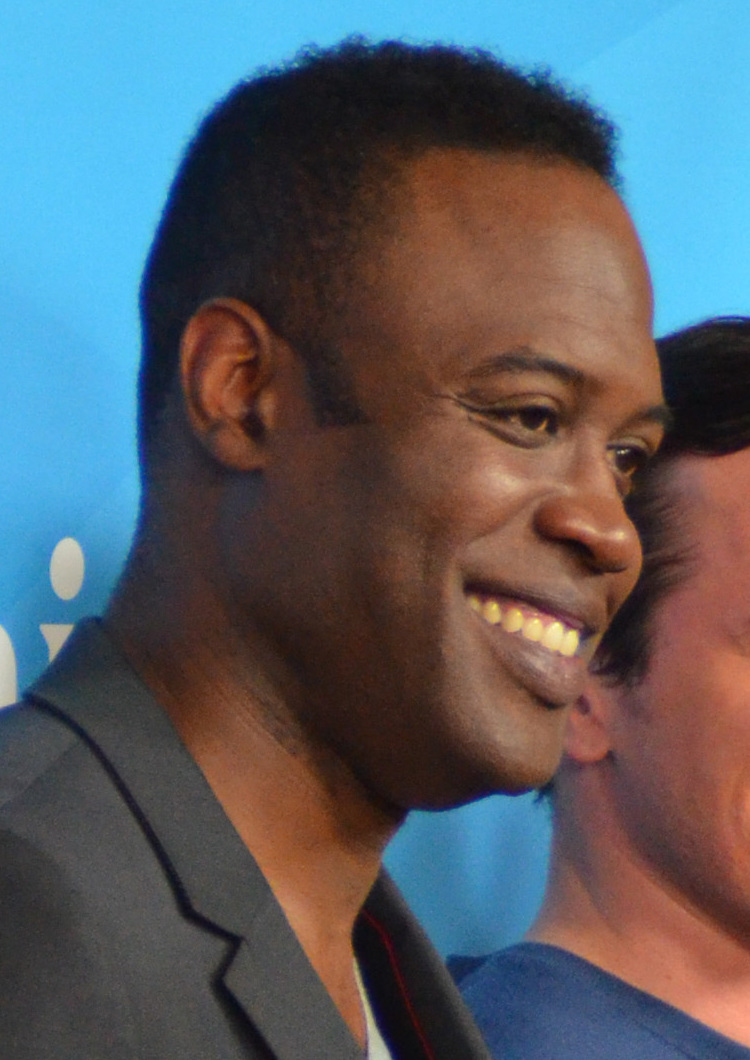
- First appearance: "Dance Dance Revelation"; 2x10, December 8, 2010
- Last appearance: "The Last Thanksgiving"; 11x07, November 20, 2019
- Portrayed by: Kevin Daniels

In-universe information
- Full name: Longines St. Jermaine
- Gender: Male
- Occupation: Cologne Salesman at the Mall; Owner of a Clothing Store

Longinus (Kevin Daniels) is a close friend of Mitchell Pritchett and Cameron Tucker's. Although he was first mentioned in the "Pilot," he made his first on-screen appearance in "Dance Dance Revelation". He sprays Phil with cologne on the face, and Phil, who is very upset, grabs the cologne bottle and goes off on Longinus with about a dozen good spritzes to the face, even chasing him around the store.

In "Boys' Night," he hangs out with Mitch, Cam, Pepper, Crispin, and Jay on their "boys' night out".

In "Go Bullfrogs!" he invites Mitch and Cam to a boutique opening, and they go along with Claire, as she needs a fun night out. Mitch and Cam soon leave the place, leaving Claire with a man called Julian. Mitch and Cam believe that Julian is Longinus' date, but Longinus tells them via Mitch's cellphone that he's not his date, he's his trainer, and he's also straight.

In "Snip," after Mitch starts thinking that Cam has to search for a new job, Longinus says that he has a vacancy at his clothing store and asks Cam if he wants the job. He finally accepts it, but a friend of Longinus', Jeoux, calls out Mitch and Longinus' devious plan of giving the job to Cam, and he walks out very upset.

In the two-part episode "The Wedding," he attends Mitch and Cam's wedding.

In "Fight or Flight," he, Mitch, Cam, Pepper, and Ronaldo organize a belated baby shower for Sal.

==== Crispin ====
Crispin
- First appearance: "Boys' Night"; 2x18, March 23, 2011
- Last appearance: "Fulgencio"; 4x13, January 23, 2013
- Portrayed by: Craig Zimmerman

In-universe information
- Full name: Crispin Gould
- Gender: Male
- Occupation: Unknown

Crispin (Craig Zimmerman) is one of Mitchell and Cameron's friends.

He has appeared in the episodes "Treehouse" and "Boys' Night," where he mentiones he has a thing for older men and was temporarily infatuated with Jay.

In "Fulgencio," he has a boyfriend, Brett.

==== Walt Kleezak ====
Walt Kleezak
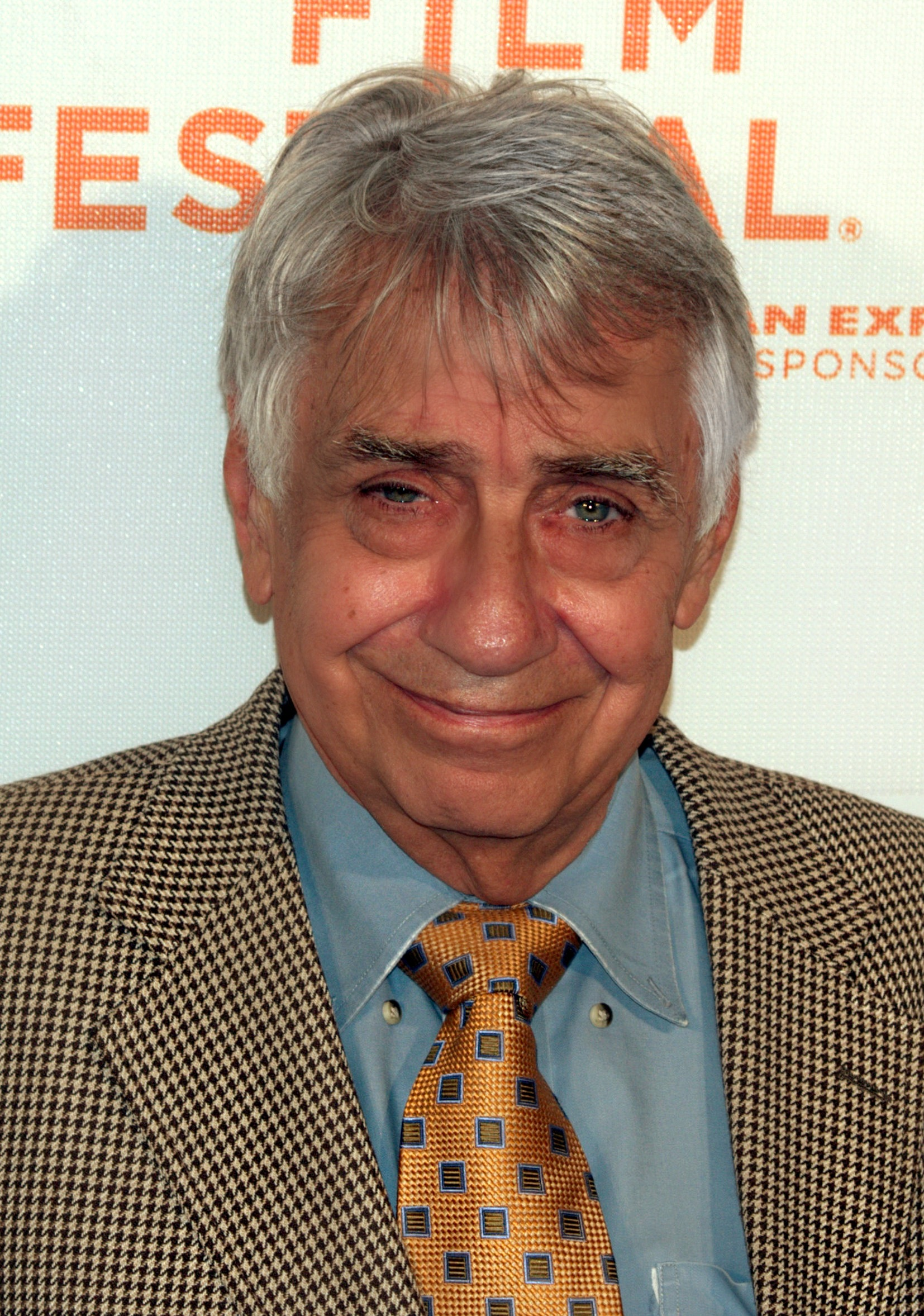
- First appearance: "Boys' Night"; 2x18, March 23, 2011
- Last appearance: "Election Day"; 3x19 April 11, 2012
- Portrayed by: Philip Baker Hall

In-universe information
- Full name: Walt Leslie Kleezak
- Gender: Male
- Occupation: Retired fireman
- Spouse: Mrs. Kleezak (?-?)
- Children: unnamed daughter

Walt Kleezak (Philip Baker Hall) was Phil and Claire's next-door neighbor. He first appeared in the episode "Boys' Night," where Luke goes over to his house to retrieve their ball, which had flown into his yard. Phil and Claire find out and are not pleased with Luke because they feel that Walt is not very nice. They then go over to his house to interrogate him, and he snaps at them and tells them to keep Luke. The next morning, Luke reprimands Walt for not being nice to his parents and could not hang out. Walt then makes things up by generously giving Claire and Phil onions from his garden and tells them that he used to be a fireman, so he never hurts kids, and becomes friends with the Dunphys through his friendship with Luke.

In "Lifetime Supply," he comes over to the Dunphy house with Luke to play video games and, upon entering, tells Gloria to win a war some time, and then they (Americans) would start talking like her. He then plays with Luke and beats him due to Phil always staring at Luke. Phil asks Walt if he thinks about death and Walt replies that he's 85 and death is his roommate. He then leaves to change his oxygen tank.

In "Election Day," he comes to attend Claire's election vote as Phil was given the task of driving 50 senior citizens to the polls to vote for Claire, but only managed to bring Walt. He kept needing things: his glasses, a new oxygen tank, food, and to take his pills. This results in the polls closing, and Phil gets only one extra vote for Claire instead of fifty.

In "The Last Walt," it was revealed that Walt died from a heart attack. Luke decided he wants to inherit Walt's television which he does. It was also revealed that Walt had a daughter whom he became estranged from, and he had never fixed his estrangement from her.

=== Introduced in season 4 ===
==== Gil Thorpe ====
Gil Thorpe
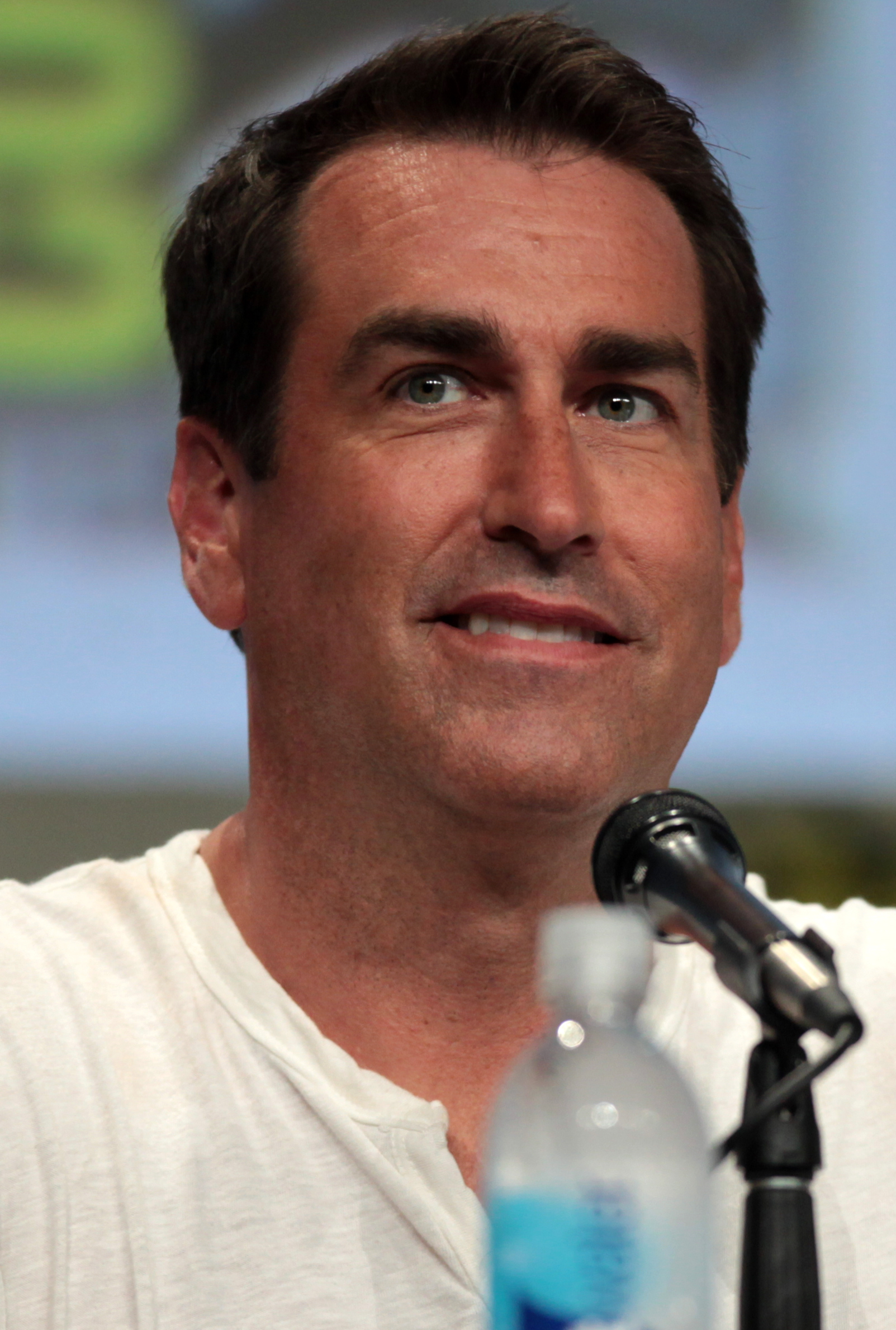
- First appearance: "Flip Flop"; 4x20, April 10, 2013
- Portrayed by: Rob Riggle

In-universe information
- Full name: Gilead Thorpe
- Gender: Male
- Occupation: Real Estate Agent
- Family: Gunther Thorpe (father); Mrs. Thorpe (mother)
- Spouse: Mrs. Thorpe (divorced)
- Children: unnamed son unnamed daughter unnamed child unnamed child

Gil Thorpe (Rob Riggle) is Southern California's most successful real estate agent and nemesis/arch-rival of Phil Dunphy. Phil is often seen on camera lamenting over constantly coming second to Gil in many real estate competitions. He is mentioned indirectly in "Not in My House", "Diamond in the Rough", and "Strangers on a Treadmill". He appears for the first time in character in the episode "Flip Flop" as he attempts to strike a deal for his buyer through Phil on the home renovated by Claire and Cam. He makes his second appearance on the show in the episode "Career Day," where he shows up for Career Day in Luke and Manny's class during Phil's presentation. Seeing Claire's visible frustration at being a housewife, he offers her a position on his real estate team. He is known for his energetic, lively, and harassing personality as well as his tendency to use his name in replacement of words in conversation (e.g., "Thorpedoed," "Gil Pickles"). In the episode "Career Day," Gil mentioned he played quarterback at Texas Tech. It is revealed his daughter is a student in Luke and Manny's class. In "The Feud," he returns, beating Phil at a real estate contest, but Luke wrestles against Thorpe's son. Luke ends up losing to Gil's son in the wrestling match.

In the episode "Kids These Days," Gil was spotted in a gay bar by Phil and Mitchell and reluctantly admitted to being gay to the pair. He also mentions that he and his wife had divorced.

=== Introduced in season 5 ===
==== Andy Bailey ====
Andy Bailey
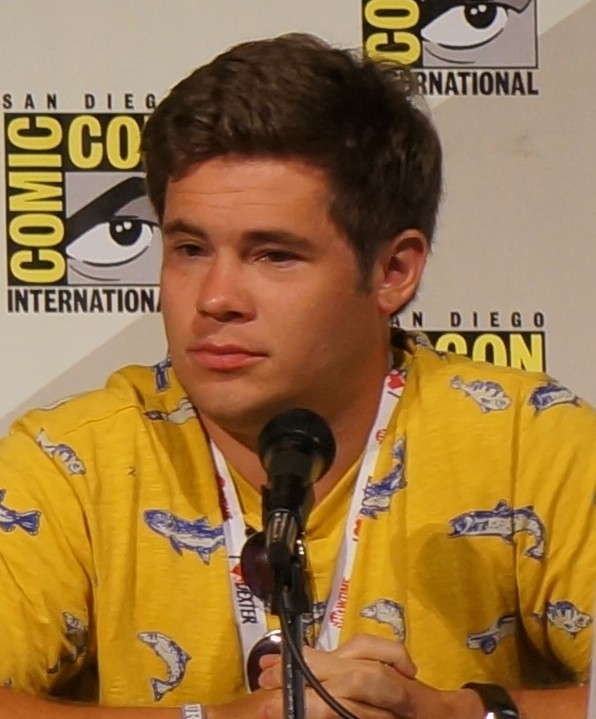
- First appearance: "The Help"; 5x06, October 23, 2013
- Last appearance: "The Escape"; 9x21, May 9, 2018
- Portrayed by: Adam DeVine

In-universe information
- Full name: Andrew Eileen Bailey
- Gender: Male
- Occupation: Manny AKA male nanny, assistant Realtor
- Family: Mr. Bailey (father; deceased); Mrs. Bailey (mother)
- Significant others: Beth (ex-fiancée); Haley Dunphy (ex-Girlfriend)

Andy Bailey (Adam DeVine) is the Pritchetts' nanny for Joe. He is amiable, cordial, slightly naive at times, but still smart and refuses to use any "bad language". Gloria took an immediate liking to Andy upon meeting him. Still, Jay disapproved of his overly friendly nature, saying, "He's a weird man. He's like Phil; only I have to pay for him." He often butts heads with Haley as she is rude and breaks the rules, and she makes fun of him for his overly amiable nature. He talks about his long-time girlfriend who is in the Coast Guard in Utah, but she breaks up with him in "The Wedding (Part 1)". Haley discovers that she has been keeping Andy "on the hook" for the last seven years as they have been on-again-off-again, and she does not treat Andy the way he treats her. His father died of cancer when he was 14, as explained in "The Help". Haley begins to appreciate Andy's demeanor and treatment of women in "Other People's Children" and tries to perhaps start a relationship with him in the two-part episode "The Wedding". However, Alex convinces Haley that she is not that into him. She stops her pursuit as Andy was ready to jump into it. Afterward, Andy drives away, perhaps to his flight to see his ex-girlfriend. Andy also becomes a quick friend to the Dunphy family.

In the Season 6 episode "The Cold," Andy and Haley discuss their relationship. They agree that they should stay friends. However, Haley gets upset when Andy claims that if they had kissed, she wouldn't get over him. To try to prove him wrong, Haley kisses him. Andy is unaffected by this, but Haley has a smitten look afterward. In the episode "Queer Eyes, Full Hearts" Haley helps Andy get a job as Phil's assistant, and Andy helps her prepare for an interview with a fashion designer. During the episode, they seem completely platonic, and it is also revealed that Andy is back together with Beth. In "Rash Decisions," Luke becomes distant from Phil, and Andy becomes his right-hand man. In the episode "Connection Lost," Claire assumes by mistake that Haley and Andy had gotten married. In "Closet? You'll Love It!", Andy ends up at the hospital due to appendicitis which had Haley worried enough to visit him but arrived at him a bit too groggy with the drugs the doctors had given him, leading her to tell his sleeping form that he had a shot with her, unbeknownst to Haley that he had heard everything she said. Andy decides to talk to her about her hospital visit in "Grill, Interrupted", but Haley's new boyfriend interrupts them before Andy could bring it up. At the end of the episode, Haley mentions to Andy that she wasn't looking for a serious relationship at the moment, which appeared to disappoint him. In the Season 6 finale "American Skyper," Andy reveals to Phil that he already had the engagement ring that he had been saving up for, but is hesitant to propose to Beth because he's still confused about the feelings he has for someone else. Phil advises him to propose to Beth but later finds out that Andy had feelings for Haley, who was also in love with Andy. The episode ends with Phil attempting to tell Andy and Haley that they loved each other but failing to do so, as Andy leaves the house to propose to Beth at a beach he liked. As of "White Christmas" in Season 7, Andy and Haley are in a relationship. In season 8, he and Haley broke up because of a long-distance relationship.

==== Ronaldo ====
Ronaldo
- First appearance: "The Help"; 5x06, October 23, 2013
- Portrayed by: Christian Barillas

In-universe information
- Full name: Ronaldo Muñoz-Saltzman
- Gender: Male
- Occupation: Wedding Planner, Pepper's Assistant
- Significant other: Pepper Saltzman (boyfriend)

Ronaldo is Pepper Saltzman's assistant and later boyfriend. He has mentioned he is from Guatemala. However, it is unknown if he was born there.

==== Rhonda ====
Rhonda
- First appearance: "iSpy"; 5x14, February 5, 2014
- Portrayed by: Arden Belle

In-universe information
- Gender: Female
- Occupation: Student

Rhonda (Arden Belle) is a friend of Luke and Manny. In "iSpy," she, Luke, Manny, and some other friends of theirs (mostly boys) make a movie about zombies.

In "Spring-a-Ding-Fling," Luke has a date with Rhonda for the spring dance in their high school. Claire wants to help him score with her, so she helps Rhonda dress more like a girl and be beautiful, as she always wears filthy and manly clothes. Luke is not happy because he preferred her the way she was and asks Claire to "fix" her. However, the two are later seen dancing together, so he may like the new Rhonda.

=== Introduced in season 6 ===
==== Earl Chambers ====
Earl Chambers
- First appearance: "Won't You Be Our Neighbor"; 6x05, October 22, 2014
- Last appearance: "Halloween 4: The Revenge of Rod Skyhook"; 8x05, October 26, 2016
- Portrayed by: Jon Polito (season 6-season 7); Robert Costanzo (season 8)

In-universe information
- Full name: Earl Jethro Chambers
- Gender: Male
- Occupation: Owner of closet company
- Family: Mr. Chambers (son); Mrs. Chambers (daughter-n-law)
- Spouse: Mrs. Chambers (wife)

Earl Chambers (Jon Polito and Robert Costanzo) was Jay's former best friend and longtime enemy. Many years before the events of "Won't You Be Our Neighbor," Earl and Jay worked together. They had formed their closet company, Closet-fornia, and the business became successful. One day, Jay came into work, and Earl's desk had been cleared out. He had badmouthed Jay to half their Rolodex, and Jay had to start all over. In the present, it turns out Manny met Earl's granddaughter Sophie in his theater group, and she is now his new girlfriend. This makes Jay mad when he finds out that his rival is her grandfather after showing a new idea of his for work.

Gloria organizes a dinner for the two men to work things out, but they soon start disputing again. Earl is also angered to hear that his granddaughter is groping his rival's stepson.

Earl goes to Jay and Gloria's house because he thinks the rivalry between him and Jay is getting way out of control and wants to work it out. Manny then enters and introduces himself; Earl asks if this is "the stud who's been groping [his] Sophie," Manny tries to assure him that there's nothing untoward between Manny and Sophie. Earl laughs and tells Manny he "believes" him (maybe, maybe not). Earl sees the box that Jay had shown earlier to Manny, Gloria, and Sophie, and Earl says he thinks he will call it the Sock 'n Roll, takes the box, and leaves. Jay shouts at him, "The hell you are!"

Earl reappears in "The Closet Case" where Mitchell has been called to work for him in a consultant job. Earl tricks Mitchell into thinking that Earl wants to bury the hatchet with Jay. A van pulls up in front of Jay's house, and Jay sees what has happened. That night, Jay and Mitchell break into Earl's office, and Earl catches them; Mitchell is disgusted at Earl for tricking him. Earl and Jay start fighting again, and later in Jay's car, Mitchell returns his father's old Rolodex to him. This gesture makes Jay very happy; Mitchell snuck it out of Earl's office while he and Jay had their ten-minute fight.

Earl reappears in "The Cover-Up" where it turns out that he is leaving horrible comments on Jay's new web show. Jay and Manny track Earl down to his house and, with help from Alex, find out that he's the one doing it. After a brief fight, Earl suggests that he and Jay could make their collective show, to which Jay refuses. Earl decides to make his show instead and deactivates comments – much to Jay's wrath – so Jay won't be able to troll him back.

Earl briefly reappears in "Halloween 4: The Revenge of Rod Skyhook" (now played by Robert Costanzo, because Jon Polito died), dressed as the Devil. He fights with Jay, dressed as Jesus, and asks Manny to steal a picture from Earl's mansion. The two start fighting until Jay looks at his reflection in the mirror and gives up on trying to take the picture.

In "In Your Head," it was revealed that Earl has died and left his ashes, along with a note, for Jay to complete a mind game to locate where he has to spread his ashes.

==== Ronnie LaFontaine ====
Ronnie LaFontaine
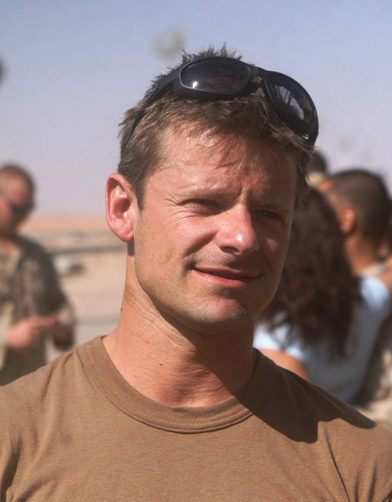
- First appearance: "Won't You Be Our Neighbor"; 6x05, October 22, 2014
- Portrayed by: Steve Zahn

In-universe information
- Full name: Ronnie Luster LaFontaine
- Gender: Male
- Occupation: Medical Marijuana Vendor
- Spouse: Amber LaFontaine (wife)
- Children: Ronnie LaFontaine Jr. (son); Tammy LaFontaine (daughter)

Ronnie LaFontaine (Steve Zahn) is a man who moves next door to the Dunphys with his wife, Amber, and their children, Ronnie Jr. and Tammy. He and his wife both turn out to be loud and obnoxious, and the Dunphys dislike them. Their rivalry soon ends in "Knock 'Em Down" when they share a mutual dislike of a pornographic statue in their neighborhood, and they soon go out to dinner and discover the Dunphys and the LaFontaines have many things in common, and later that same night, they are drinking wine together in their neighborhood.

==== Amber LaFontaine ====
Amber LaFontaine
- First appearance: "Won't You Be Our Neighbor"; 6x05, October 22, 2014
- Portrayed by: Andrea Anders

In-universe information
- Gender: Female
- Occupation: Unknown
- Spouse: Ronnie LaFontaine (husband)
- Children: Ronnie LaFontaine Jr. (son); Tammy LaFontaine (daughter)

Amber LaFontaine (Andrea Anders) is a woman who moves next door to the Dunphys with her husband, Ronnie, and their children, Ronnie Jr. and Tammy. She and her husband both turn out to be loud and obnoxious, and the Dunphys dislike them. Their rivalry went from their first meeting until the episode "Knock 'Em Down," when they share a mutual dislike of a pornographic statue in their neighborhood, and they soon go out to dinner and discover the Dunphys and the LaFontaines have many things in common and later that same night they are drinking wine together in their neighborhood.

==== Ronnie LaFontaine Jr. ====
Ronnie LaFontaine Jr.
- First appearance: "Won't You Be Our Neighbor"; 6x05, October 22, 2014
- Portrayed by: Finneas O'Connell

In-universe information
- Gender: Male
- Occupation: Student
- Family: Ronnie LaFontaine (father); Amber LaFontaine (mother); Tammy LaFontaine (sister)

Ronnie LaFontaine (Finneas O'Connell) is the son of Ronnie and Amber LaFontaine and the brother of Tammy LaFontaine. They move in next door to the Dunphys. He likes to play music, plays the drum kit, and is currently studying in New York.

==== Tammy LaFontaine ====
Tammy LaFontaine
- First appearance: "Won't You Be Our Neighbor"; 6x05, October 22, 2014
- Portrayed by: Brooke Sorenson

In-universe information
- Gender: Female
- Occupation: Student
- Family: Ronnie LaFontaine (father); Amber LaFontaine (mother); Ronnie LaFontaine Jr. (brother)

Tammy LaFontaine (Brooke Sorenson) is the daughter of Ronnie and Amber LaFontaine and the sister of Ronnie LaFontaine Jr. In "The Big Guns," Luke develops a crush on Tammy; however, every time he tries to flirt with her, she insults him and blows him off. At the end of the episode, Luke passes Tammy without even glancing at her and pretends he no longer cares about her, which bothers Tammy enough that she wants him to come back and talk to her, and it turns out Alex gave Luke this advice.

==== Beth ====
Beth
- First appearance: "Closet? You'll Love It!"; 6x17, March 4, 2015
- Last appearance: "White Christmas"; 7x09, December 9, 2015
- Portrayed by: Laura Ashley Samuels

In-universe information
- Gender: Female
- Occupation: United States Coast Guard
- Family: unnamed mother
- Significant other: Andy Bailey (ex-fiancé)

Beth (Laura Ashley Samuels) is Andy's ex-fiancée. She was first seen in "Closet? You'll Love It!" to visit Andy in the hospital. She reappeared in "American Skyper" where she seemed to have been responsible for setting Haley's hair on fire and was last seen in "Summer Lovin," where she makes a cameo and she and Andy walk in the park. He proposes to her, and she accepts. Thus, they become engaged and are being watched by Haley and Claire.

She reappeared in "The More You Ignore Me," where she and Andy meet Haley and Dylan at the movies, and in "White Christmas," she comes to the cabin where the family is with Andy, and she admits to him that she has been cheating on him behind his back and it looks like they end things.

==== Sanjay Patel ====
Sanjay Patel
- First appearance: "Patriot Games"; 6x17, May 6, 2015
- Portrayed by: Suraj Partha

In-universe information
- Gender: Male
- Occupation: Student
- Family: Vish Patel (father); Nina Patel (mother)
- Significant other: Alex Dunphy (ex-girlfriend)

Sanjay Patel (Suraj Partha) is Alex's former academic rival and ex-boyfriend. While they had still been at school, Alex and Sanjay had been competing against each other nonstop. Sanjay had only been mentioned in "Our Children, Ourselves", "See You Next Fall", "Career Day", "Under Pressure", "Sleeper", and "Integrity". He eventually made his first appearance in "Patriot Games", where he and Alex were tied in the first position for valedictorian and only didn't have gym grades completed. Principal Brown organized a race for the two, and the one who did fours laps first wins. Sanjay goes to Alex's house and tells her that he likes her and that she is the reason he can attend Stanford University because she was always pushing him to study more and become better. But when the race happens, Sanjay forfeits it to prove to Alex that he was telling the truth and the two of them end up in a passionate kiss in front of their parents, much to their delight except Sanjay's mother, Nina. Sanjay and Alex are eventually named co-valedictorians of 2015.

Sanjay reappears in "Summer Lovin'", and he and Alex are now dating. They go up to Alex's room after he asks her to test him on the periodic table, and later, they would break up when Sanjay leaves for school, but in the end, they decide against it. However, in "The Closet Case", Alex reveals that Sanjay broke up with her because he sees someone new.

=== Introduced in season 7 ===
==== Erica ====
Erica
- First appearance: "Summer Lovin"; 6x17, September 23, 2015
- Portrayed by: Vicki Lewis

In-universe information
- Gender: Female
- Occupation: Preschool teacher

Erica is a teacher who works at The Learnin' Barn.

She is Tommy and Joe's teacher and is known to be a hippie. Jay is not very fond of her at first, but Gloria convinces him to let Joe stay at the Learnin' Barn.

Jay also points out that he doesn't like the name of the school, although Gloria does. Erica and Jay don't get along very well, but since Erica is a hippie, she is thrilled to pretend she likes him.

Jay tells the Feelings Table that he wants to break the table over "a hippie" (referring to Erica.) as she was annoying him with his happiness.

=== Introduced in season 8 ===
==== Rainer Shine ====
Rainer Shine
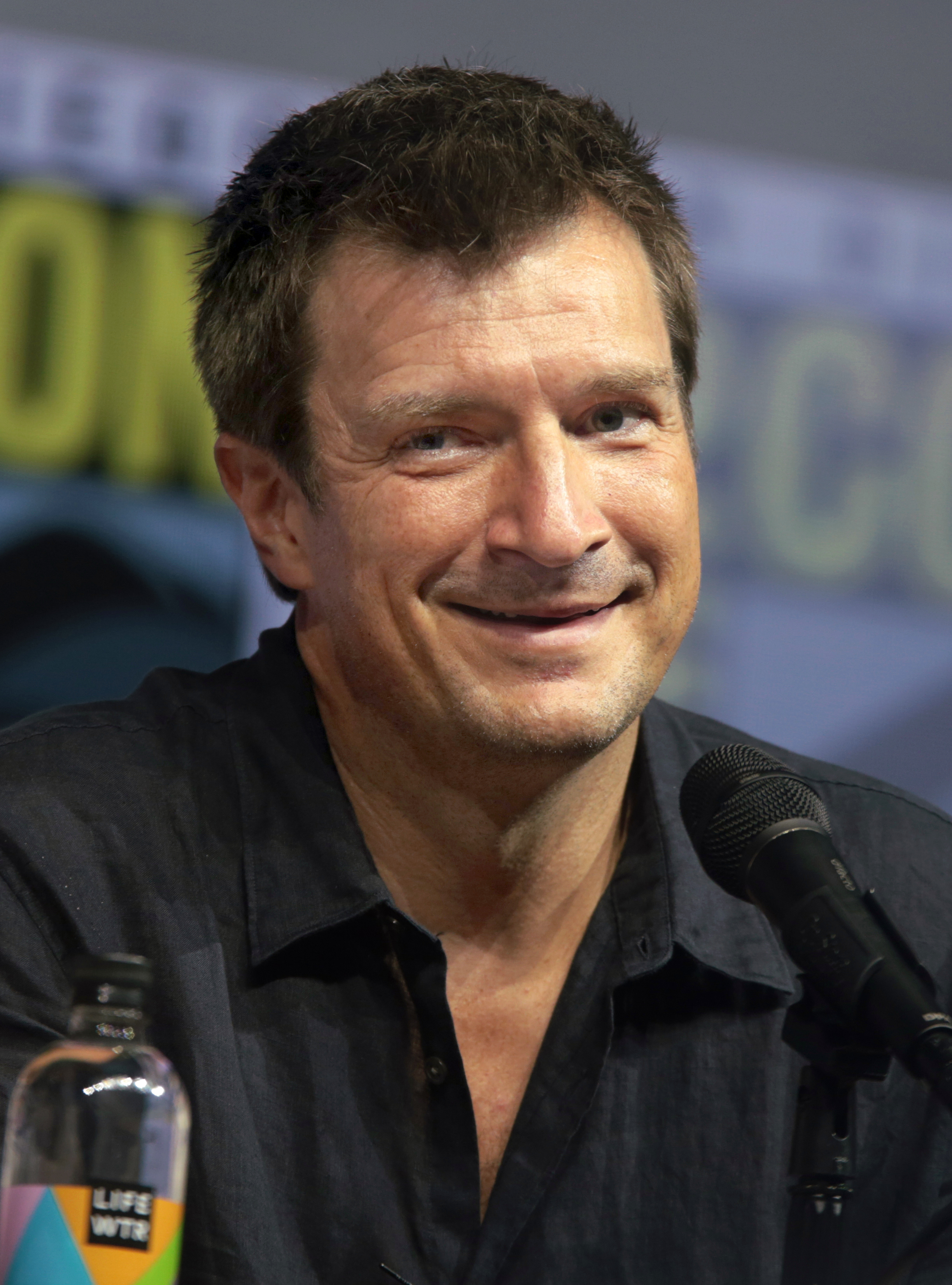
- First appearance: "Weathering Heights"; 8x04, October 12, 2016
- Portrayed by: Nathan Fillion

In-universe information
- Full name: Rainer Colton Shine
- Gender: Male
- Occupation: Weatherman
- Family: April Shine (daughter)
- Significant other: Haley Dunphy (ex-girlfriend)

Rainer Shine is a weatherman that Phil and Haley meet in "Weathering Heights". Phil tries to make friends with Rainer but accidentally invites him to ask Haley out on a date that ends in Rainer and Haley dating, much to Phil's displeasure.

In "Five Minutes", Rainer proposes to Haley. She accepts, but the engagement lasts less than five minutes since they both start having doubts after Rainer realizes that he was wrong about that night's weather forecast.

=== Introduced in season 9 ===
==== Arvin Fennerman ====
Dr. Arvin Fennerman
- First appearance: "In Your Head"; 9x13, January 17, 2018
- Last appearance: "Baby Steps"; 11x15, March 18, 2020
- Portrayed by: Chris Geere

In-universe information
- Gender: Male
- Occupation: Astrophysics professor at Caltech
- Family: Malcolm Fennerman (father); Iris Fennerman (mother)
- Significant other: Haley Dunphy (ex-girlfriend)

Dr. Arvin Fennerman (Chris Geere) is a teacher at Alex's school, The California Institute of Technology a.k.a. Caltech. Arvin first appears in "In Your Head" when Haley sneaks into Alex's class to get her to read over her writing sample before she goes to an interview at Nerp. Haley ends up interrupting the class before Alex rushes her out. Arvin later finds both of them in the schoolyard and tells Haley that the two of them will get married one day, that he doesn't understand it, but he just knows because of all the probability scenes he's been running in his head end up with the two of them marrying. Haley later uses a similar speech to get the job she's applying for and later accepts his contact request. It's unclear whether Arvin believes this or if it's just a clever pick-up line.

Arvin is a two-time Vanderscoff Grant winner, one for philosophy and one for geometry.

He and Haley begin dating but break up in "Torn Between Two Lovers" when Haley decides to get back together with Dylan. Eventually, Arvin begins dating Alex, when the two of them begin working together in the series finale.

==== Bill ====
Bill
- First appearance: "Royal Visit"; 9x17, March 28, 2018
- Last appearance: "The Last Halloween"; 11x05, October 30, 2019
- Portrayed by: Jimmy Tatro

In-universe information
- Gender: Male
- Significant other: Alex Dunphy (ex-girlfriend)

Bill (Jimmy Tatro) is a firefighter that meets Alex when she burns a bagel bite in the microwave in her dorm room after overindulging in a pity party over her sister Haley dating her school professor and crush, Arvin. Bill wakes her up and gets her out of the smokey room. Bill and Alex start dating soon after that.

They break up in "The Last Halloween" when Bill is upset that a creepy colleague steals his identity to seduce Alex.

=== Introduced in season 10 ===
==== Jerry ====
Jerry
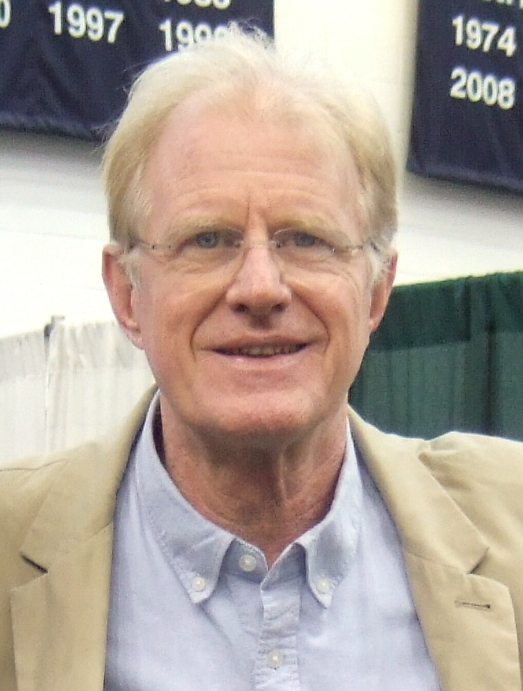
- First appearance: "Putting Down Roots"; 10x09, December 5, 2018
- Last appearance: "Tree's a Crowd"; 11x08, December 4, 2019
- Portrayed by: Ed Begley Jr.

In-universe information
- Full name: Jerry Dinsdale
- Gender: Male
- Family: Unknown
- Spouse: DeDe Pritchett (m. 2016; died 2018)
- Children: James (son); Claire Dunphy (stepdaughter); Mitchell Pritchett (stepson)
- Relatives: Phil Dunphy (stepson-in-law); Cameron Tucker (stepson-in-law); Haley Dunphy (step-granddaughter); Alex Dunphy (step-granddaughter); Luke Dunphy (step-grandson); Lily Tucker-Pritchett (adoptive step-granddaughter); Rexford Tucker-Pritchett (adoptive step-grandson); Dylan Marshall (step-grandson-in-law); George Marshall (step-great-grandson); Poppy Marshall (step-great-granddaughter); Lucas Williams (father-in-law; deceased); BeBe Williams (sister-in-law); CeCe Williams (sister-in-law)

Jerry (Ed Begley Jr.) is DeDe Pritchett's second husband and her widower, and Claire and Mitchell's stepfather.

In "Putting Down Roots," Jerry comes to town to bequeath her possessions to the family. Mitch and Claire receive a little more of DeDe than they know what to do with, and Jay and Gloria feel sorry for Jerry and invite him to stay with them while he is in town. Jay, Mitchell, and Claire all watch as Jerry comes up the driveway full of items and knickknacks- DeDe's possessions. Jay receives a jar of sand, Mitchell a box of jewelry, and Claire DeDe's old sports car. Jerry then informs the three that DeDe's ashes were infused into a tree to give to her children. Claire refuses, leaving "DeDe" with Mitchell. Jay, alongside Jerry, heads to Mitchell's house to talk to "DeDe". While Jay apologizes for being so headstrong, Jerry yells at the tree all the anger he's kept inside. Mitchell overhears his father's apology and decides to do the same to Cam. Mitch agrees that when they need to, they'll all move to the farm. As Cam begins to list everything a farmer has to do and watch out for, Mitchell begins regretting his decision.

In "Tree's a Crowd", Jerry pays a visit to Phil and Claire and meets Dylan's mother, Farrah, where its implied there is a mutual attraction due to their similar spiritual beliefs.

== Guest stars who appeared on one or two episodes ==
A number of familiar actors appeared on the series only once or twice.

Actor	Character	Season	Episode	Episode title
Minnie Driver	Valerie	1	14	"Moon Landing"
Edward Norton	Izzy LaFontaine	1	8	"Great Expectations"
Judy Greer	Denise	1	17	"Truth Be Told"
Matt Dillon	Robbie Sullivan	2	11	"Slow Down Your Neighbors"
Lin-Manuel Miranda	Guillermo	2	22	"Good Cop, Bad Dog"
Gilles Marini	Julian	3	6	"Go Bullfrogs!"
Leslie Mann	Katie	3	7	"Treehouse"
Kevin Hart	Andre	3 3	7 21	”Treehouse” “Planes, Trains, and Cars"
Jennifer Tilly	Darlene	3 5	7 13	"Treehouse" "Three Dinners"
Greg Kinnear	Tad	3	14	“Me? Jealous?”
Ernie Hudson	Miles	3 4	16 1	"Virgin Territory" "Bringing Up Baby"
Bobby Cannavale	Lewis	3	18	"Send Out the Clowns"
Matthew Broderick	Dave	4	8	"Mistery Date"
Aisha Tyler	Wendy	5	16	"Spring a Ding-Fling"
Stephen Merchant	Higgins	5 11	18 10	"Las Vegas" "The Prescott"
Michael Urie	Gavin Sinclair	6 6	7 21	"Queer Eyes, Full Hearts" "Integrity"
Catherine O'Hara	Dr. Debra Radcliffe	7	8	"Clean Out Your Junk Drawer"
Andrea Martin	Fig	7	9	"White Christmas"
Keegan-Michael Key	Tom Delaney	7	10	"Playdates"
Christine Lakin	Lisa Delaney	7	10	"Playdates"
Martin Short	Merv Schechter	8	3,5	"Blindsided"
Martin Short	Merv Schechter	8	5	"Halloween 4: The Revenge of Rod Skyhook"
Kelsey Grammer	Keifth	8	10	"Ringmaster Keifth"
Victor Garber	Chef Dumont	8	13	"Do It Yourself"
Peyton Manning	Coach Gary	8	13	"Do It Yourself"
Vanessa Williams	Rhonda	9	2	"The Long Goodbye"
James Van Der Beek	Bo Johnson	9	10	"No Small Feet"
Fred Savage	Caleb	9	12	"Dear Beloved Family"
Cheyenne Jackson	Max	9	13	"In Your Head"

== Cameo appearances ==
Several public figures appeared as themselves on Modern Family in cameo roles.

Individual	Season	Episode	Episode title
Kobe Bryant	1	24	"Family Portrait"
Billy Dee Williams	4	11	"New Year's Eve"
Charles Barkley	6	11	"The Day We Almost Died"
Terry Bradshaw	6	22	"Patriot Games"
DeAndre Jordan	7	7	"Phil’s Sexy, Sexy House"
Ray Liotta, Barbra Streisand	7	10	"Playdates"
Terry Bradshaw, Billy Crystal, Chris Martin	9	8	"Brushes with Celebrity"
George Brett	9	17	"Royal Visit"
David Beckham, Courteney Cox, Snoop Dogg (voice)	11	10	"The Prescott"
