= Disneyland (Modern Family) =

- Modern Family episode
- Episode no.: Season 3 Episode 22
- Directed by: James Bagdonas
- Written by: Cindy Chupack
- Production code: 3ARG22
- Original air date: May 9, 2012

Guest appearances
- Reid Ewing as Dylan; Matt Prokop as Ethan; Sarah Baker as twins' mom

Episode chronology
← Previous "Planes, Trains and Cars"	Next → "Tableau Vivant"
- Modern Family season 3

"Disneyland" is the 22nd episode of the third season of the American sitcom Modern Family and the series' 70th overall. It first aired on ABC on May 9, 2012. It was written by Cindy Chupack and directed by James Bagdonas. The episode is set and filmed in Disneyland and follows the whole family as they dealt with their chaotic conflicts while attending the theme park. Reid Ewing guest stars as Dylan.

== Plot ==
As the family prepares for a day trip to Disneyland, Claire (Julie Bowen) upsets Haley (Sarah Hyland) by bringing her friend's college-aged nephew, Ethan (Matt Prokop), with the intent of setting them up, however, both Haley and Alex (Ariel Winter) take a liking to Ethan. Phil (Ty Burrell) and Luke (Nolan Gould) are excited when Luke finally meets the height requirement to ride the thrill attractions. Gloria (Sofía Vergara) insists she will be fine wearing high-heeled shoes to the park, despite Jay (Ed O'Neill) warning her she won't feel comfortable, while Manny (Rico Rodriguez) is upset that the trip conflicts with a stock market school project. Mitchell (Jesse Tyler Ferguson) and Cameron (Eric Stonestreet) use a child leash on Lily (Aubrey Anderson-Emmons) as a result of her going through a phase of running away.

Phil and Luke ride Indiana Jones Adventure but Phil disembarks the ride feeling unwell and, much to his dismay, Jay explains that it's a normal part of aging. Phil refuses to hear it and joins Luke in riding Big Thunder Mountain Railroad to prove he's still young, which backfires and Phil, now feeling very ill, tells Luke to ride Space Mountain without him. At the end of the day, Phil is relieved to learn he's just come down with the flu because of a high fever.

While walking through the park, the family encounters Dylan (Reid Ewing), Haley's on-and-off ex-boyfriend, who is taken aback by her presence at the park. Haley then loses interest in Ethan, who begins taking interest in Alex. Later, Haley and Claire see Dylan working at Disneyland as a Dapper Dan, which upsets Haley and causes her to return to Ethan, who leaves Alex. Later, while Haley and Ethan are taking pictures, Dylan reveals himself to be in the Little John costume and confesses to them that he still loves Haley, but Ethan pushes him to the ground and he is unable to get up. Dylan reunites with Haley and her family and explains he was fired from the dude ranch in Wyoming after he's later fired from the park. Haley requests her family to give Dylan a ride back home after getting back together, as she mentions that Ethan left the group to meet up with friends.

After Gloria rides Splash Mountain, Jay suggests to her that her choice of shoe is getting to her, which she aggressively dismisses. Later, Jay buys her comfortable slippers and suggests that constantly wearing uncomfortable shoes makes her irritable, to which she agrees it may be true and is grateful to be able to walk the rest of the day without pain. Mitchell, worried about being judged, unhooks Lily's child leash and she immediately runs off but Jay catches her and purchases her child-sized high-heeled shoes, rendering her unable to run away, much to Mitchell's and Cameron's relief.

Throughout the day, Manny works on his school project over the phone during his family's outing to the theme park, with his friend and classmate, Reuben, on the other line. While riding Dumbo the Flying Elephant, Gloria tells Manny to stop caring so much about his school project and instead enjoy his day in the park.

The episode ends with the family watching Great Moments with Mr. Lincoln as Jay reflects how he once took Claire and Mitchell to Disneyland after a fight with his then-wife, and the mother of their children, Dede. He had initially planned to end his marriage that night, but instead stuck it out for Claire and Mitchell, exclaiming the universe rewarded him with meeting Gloria.

== Reception ==
=== Ratings ===
In its original American broadcast, "Disneyland" was watched by 10.58 million viewers; up 0.52 million from the previous episode. It also acquired a 4.4/12 rating share in the 18-49 demographic group.

=== Reviews ===
Donna Bowman of The A.V. Club gave a B grade to the episode. She said "this wasn’t the funniest episode bow to stern", but she "found it charming".

Leigh Raines of TV Fanatic gave a 4.5/5 grade and said "the most touching thing about this episode was when Jay revealed why he loved the Abraham Lincoln robotic show. It wasn't because of the show, the performance itself it probably a little dull. But it made him realize that he needed to put his kids first. Jay isn't very expressive about his feelings, so it was nice when he opened up about his love for Claire and Mitchell."

Christine N. Ziemba of Paste Magazine rated the episode with 8/10 and said: "pushing that marketing angle aside, 'Disneyland' turned out to be a decent episode, faring much better than the past two offerings, with better integration of stories and more laughs—which is always great for a sitcom."

Michael Adams of 411mania rated the episode with 9/10 saying that he loved the episode. "It's so great to see the show do things like this. I thought the Hawaiian vacation the family took at the end of season 1 was one of the best episodes over the course of the 3 seasons, however, this vacation is by far the superior one."
