= The Last Walt =

- Modern Family episode
- Episode no.: Season 3 Episode 20
- Directed by: Michael Spiller
- Written by: Dan O'Shannon; Paul Corrigan; Brad Walsh
- Production code: 3ARG21
- Original air date: April 18, 2012

Guest appearances
- Barry Corbin as Merle Tucker; Stacey Travis as Kim; Malcom Foster Smith as Delivery guy

Episode chronology
← Previous "Election Day"	Next → "Planes, Trains and Cars"
- Modern Family season 3

"The Last Walt" is the 20th episode of the third season of the American sitcom Modern Family and the series' 68th episode overall. This episode originally aired on ABC on April 18, 2012. It was written by Dan O'Shannon, Paul Corrigan & Brad Walsh and directed by Michael Spiller.

== Plot ==
Claire (Julie Bowen) and Phil (Ty Burrell) regrettably inform Luke (Nolan Gould) that their elderly neighbor Walt, with whom Luke has become close friends, has died. Claire is worried by Luke's seemingly lack of emotion upon hearing the news while Phil is confused because Claire smiled while telling Luke. Later, Phil and Claire see Luke steal a television from Walt's house.

Claire attempts to get Luke to open up and learns that Walt told Luke he could take one thing when he died; still, she feels uncomfortable with the situation and accompanies Luke back to Walt's house to return the television. There, the woman who delivered meals to Walt and the postman comment negatively on Claire's smiling when she informs them that Walt has died. Luke reflects that he'll miss looking out his window and seeing the light from the television through Walt's window; Claire lets him keep the television and calls Phil to inform him that Luke is fine.

Phil learns that Walt was estranged from his daughter. Worried that he and Alex (Ariel Winter) will end up like that, he attempts to make an adventure for the two of them out of honoring Walt's last request--throwing his dog tags into the ocean. Alex is somewhat against the idea and not eager to go, but upon arriving at the beach, a seagull steals the dog tags and flies off. As they drive home, Phil sees an advertisement from a restaurant claiming to have the "world's best milkshakes" and makes a detour to stop. Seeing that their server is pregnant, he decides to try and induce labor so he and Alex will still have an adventurous night. Alex inquires about his odd behavior and he confesses to wanting to make meaningful memories, telling her the story of astronaut Eugene Cernan who carved his daughter's initials on the moon. Alex is sympathetic, then throws up. As the two leave the restaurant—having had a successful bonding adventure—Phil receives Claire's call as he writes Alex's initials the restaurant's sign which features a moon.

Haley (Sarah Hyland) wants to throw a party at Jay and Gloria's (Sofía Vergara), but Gloria only agrees if Haley can find a chaperone who Claire and Phil approve of. She also insists Manny (Rico Rodriguez) stay so he can socialize with people his age; Haley was counting on this and tells Claire that her "uncle"--which Manny could technically be considered--will be present. Thinking Haley means Mitchell or Cam, Claire agrees. Throughout the night, Manny is ardently against all the activities Haley's guests participate in, such as drinking. When Gloria returns home unexpectedly, she chastises Haley for being too reckless and Manny for being too mature. As punishment, Haley is forced to continue the party with Manny attempting to participate instead of chaperone.

Cam (Eric Stonestreet) and Mitchell (Jesse Tyler Ferguson) host Jay (Ed O'Neill) and Cam's father Merle (Barry Corbin) for dinner. The two have never bonded which causes Cam and Mitch to suspect they dislike one another. Jay is upset when Merle gifts Cam and Mitch watches but Mitch's appears more feminine. While helping disassemble a bed, Jay confesses that he feels Merle treats Mitch as if he is Cam's wife; Merle confesses that pretending like Mitch is partially a woman makes the relationship easier for him to process. Jay admits to sometimes feeling similar, and the two resolve to treat both Cam and Mitch as equal partners in the relationship.

== Production ==
This episode was written by Dan O'Shannon, Paul Corrigan and Brad Walsh, and directed by Michael Spiller. Along with the main cast, this episode featured Barry Corbin as Merle Tucker, Cameron's father.

== Reception ==
=== Ratings ===
The episode was watched by 10.21 million viewers with an adult 18-49 rating/share of 4.1/11, a slight decline from the previous episode, "Election Day".

=== Reviews ===
This episode received mixed reviews.

Michael Adams from 411mania gave the episode 8/10 saying that the character of the week was Cam's father, Merle: "Character of the week goes to our guest star this week, Barry Corbin, who created the role of Merle Tucker. Merle is the complete opposite of Cam, which makes the character so much more enjoyable to watch. However, there is a part of the 2 men that is very similar; perhaps it’s their farming background? Who knows? Either way, Merle and his gruffness was a great addition to the show this week."

Jules of Two Cents TV gave a good review to the episode saying: "I really enjoyed Phil’s story of trying to have that special day with Alex. Claire smiling as a coping mechanism was strange, but if anyone were to have something strange like that, it would be Claire. And Mr. Corbin as Cam’s dad was great!"

Leigh Raines of TV Fanatic rated the episode with 3.5/5. She liked the moments of most characters, one being Manny's small but rather memorable role. She stated "Manny had a minor storyline but it happened to be my favorite of the night." One of the moments she didn't enjoy was with Merle Tucker, Cam's father. "'The Last Walt' was an episode with a couple of different storylines running, unfortunately the dinner with Cam's dad was probably my least favorite."

Christine N. Ziemba of Paste Magazine gave the episode 6.8/10. She praised the storyline between Jay and Cameron's father and hailed Mitchell's line regarding cities and farms as the best of the night, remarking that it "was the funniest line of the night—but unfortunately, it didn't have much competition in 'The Last Walt'."

Donna Bowman from The A.V. Club gave the episode a C+ rate saying that the episode was "overstuffed". "Too bad it has to elbow for room with so many other ideas and characters in far-flung storylines. Sometimes when you overstuff an episode, you end up with less than the sum of the parts. That’s a shame when some of the parts are really good, and others could have been, with more time and a bigger spotlight."
