= Tableau Vivant (Modern Family) =

- Modern Family episode
- Episode no.: Season 3 Episode 23
- Directed by: Gail Mancuso
- Written by: Elaine Ko; Jeffrey Richman; Bill Wrubel
- Production code: 3ARG23
- Original air date: May 16, 2012

Guest appearances
- Beth Grant as Maxine; Matt Roth as Skip Woosnun; John Viener as Matt Keneally

Episode chronology
← Previous "Disneyland"	Next → "Baby on Board"
- Modern Family season 3

"Tableau Vivant" is the 23rd episode of the third season of the American sitcom Modern Family, and the series' 71st episode overall. It aired on May 16, 2012. The episode was written by Elaine Ko, Jeffrey Richman and Bill Wrubel, and directed by Gail Mancuso.

== Plot ==
Claire (Julie Bowen) is surprised to see Phil (Ty Burrell) still awake, but he's stressing over needing to fire someone. Luke (Nolan Gould) is also awake, eager to receive a medal for extinguishing a fire at school while Alex (Ariel Winter) is nervous about a living art project in which her family will be recreating Freedom from Want. Haley (Sarah Hyland) sneaks into the house after staying out past curfew and is shocked to run into Phil, but convinces him that she'd been upstairs all along trying on clothes for graduation.

The next morning, Jay (Ed O'Neill) takes Gloria (Sofía Vergara) to a diner with a sandwich named after him; Gloria is neither impressed with the sandwich nor the friendly relationship Jay has with the server, Maxine (Beth Grant). Jay tells her that families are supposed to hide truths from one another, then tells her that sometimes she's too loud but he never says anything.

Phil stops by Mitch's (Jesse Tyler Ferguson) house to fire him--the stress from the night before--but is unable to do it and instead compliments his work ethic. Later, at the agency, Mitch arrives and Phil is forced to fire him, but Mitch gets stuck in the elevator and is unable to leave. Mitch learns that the entire company thinks of him as lazy with an attitude but says that he actually doesn't want to continue with Phil's agency and purposely handed in assignments late.

Manny (Rico Rodriguez) confronts Luke about receiving the medal, revealing that Luke started the fire while being careless in the science lab. Luke plans on receiving the medal regardless.

Cam (Eric Stonestreet) and Lily (Aubrey Anderson-Emmons) stop by the Dunphy house to drop off supplies for the painting. When Lily begins flicking on and off light switches, Cam tells Claire about his new parenting strategy where he and Mitch never say "no"; Claire mocks it. Cam gets his hand stuck in the garbage disposal as Lily gets closer to the switch; Claire challenges him to say "no", which he eventually does but not before Lily turns on the switch. Nothing happens and Claire reveals that the actual switch was on the other side of the sink. Later, Haley thanks Cam for driving her home the night before.

The family unites to recreate the painting; while in their ninety-second pose, they all begin arguing and revealing secrets from the day. They're supposed to meet that night at the diner, but the various family members are upset with one another and vent in their cars about potentially skipping. Mitch reveals to Cam that he's never been fired while Phil admits to Claire that she sometimes comes off as a know-it-all and Gloria confesses to Manny that she's jealous of Jay's relationship with Maxine.

Everyone ends up at the diner, having worked out their issues in their respective cars. Gloria embraces Maxine and orders Jay's sandwich for everyone. Alex gets a B− on her project but is satisfied that her teacher finally learned her name and Claire decides that Luke will be returning his medal.

== Reception ==
=== Ratings ===
In its original American broadcast, "Tableau Vivant" was watched by 9.36 million, down 1.22 million from the previous episode.

=== Reviews ===
Reviews for this episode were generally positive.

Donna Bowman of The A.V. Club gave an A− grade. She said "I’ve said it before and I’ll say it again. What Modern Family can do so well is create an escalating snowball of farce that, when everyone ends up in the same place, unleashes a storm of comic possibilities. This episode may not be the pinnacle of that style, but it unfolds with a sense of ease, confidence, economy, and generosity that any sitcom would be proud to match. I mean, look at that beautifully underplayed closing tableau. That’s what it’s for, after all. Just look at it".

Leigh Raines of TV Fanatic gave a 4.5/5 grade. About his favorite part of the show he said: "Hands down my favorite part of this episode was small, but perfect. When Haley walked in after a night out and thought Phil was reprimanding her but really he was practicing his speech to Mitchell, I thought she was so busted."

Wyner C of Two Cents TV also gave a good review to the episode. "I laughed so much during this episode. I’ve always said, the show is best when the family is together."

Michael Adams of 411mania rated the episode with 7/10 giving a most mixed review. "All in all, it was a good episode, but as it was one of the final episodes of the season and they have some story lines to wrap up, they should have put this episode somewhere in the middle of the season."
