= Planes, Trains and Cars =

- Modern Family episode
- Episode no.: Season 3 Episode 21
- Directed by: Michael Spiller
- Written by: Paul Corrigan; Brad Walsh
- Production code: 3ARG18
- Original air date: May 2, 2012

Guest appearances
- Kevin Hart as Andre; Eric Edelstein as mechanic

Episode chronology
← Previous "The Last Walt"	Next → "Disneyland"
- Modern Family season 3

"Planes, Trains, and Cars" is the 21st episode of the third season of the American sitcom Modern Family and the series' 69th episode overall. It aired on ABC on May 2, 2012 and was written by Paul Corrigan & Brad Walsh and directed by Michael Spiller.

In the episode, Phil wants to buy a new car and despite knowing Claire would not be happy with it, he gets a two-seat convertible. Surprisingly, Claire does not react to this only because she hopes Phil will realize his mistake on his own. On a ride with Lily on the subway, Cameron and Mitchell lose her favorite stuffed rabbit. They try to convince her to choose another toy to be her favorite but she refuses, forcing them to go back to the subway and find it. Jay has to attend a college reunion and wants Gloria and Manny to go with him so he can show off his new wife to his friends, something that Gloria has no idea about. Gloria though, is afraid to travel on a small private plane and Jay is forced to drive them to the reunion.

The episode received mixed reviews from critics.

== Plot ==
At the persuasion of his friend Andre (Kevin Hart), Phil (Ty Burrell) purchases a two-seat convertible instead of the practical sedan he was supposed to get. Returning home, Luke (Nolan Gould) and Alex (Ariel Winter) worry that Claire (Julie Bowen) won't approve while Haley (Sarah Hyland) initially believes the car to be a gift for her. Eventually, Claire sees the car but refrains from expressing her disapproval. When Phil's car proves impractical for work, she agrees to switch; because he has the minivan, he must also pick the kids up from school.

At a stop light, two strangers give Claire the idea to drive up the coast. Despite having obligations, she does, and has a wonderful time. Meanwhile, Phil is pleasantly surprised to have learned about his children while driving them. While doing cartwheels on the beach, Claire loses her keys and is forced to call Phil to pick her up. The two reflect and decide to make a trip to the beach a month occurrence.

Cameron (Eric Stonestreet) and Mitchell (Jesse Tyler Ferguson) take Lily (Aubrey Anderson-Emmons) on the subway but lose her favorite stuffed animal, a rabbit, in the chaos. When they fail to get Lily to pick a new favorite stuffed animal, they return to the station and put up missing posters for the rabbit. There, they notice a homeless man sleeping with the rabbit; when he coughs on it, the two decide Lily will just have to deal with her loss.

Jay (Ed O'Neill) is ecstatic to take Gloria (Sofía Vergara) and Manny (Rico Rodriguez) on a trip to Pebble Beach for a college reunion with his old football team. He surprises the two with a private plane, but Gloria is scared by how small it is and refuses to board. As they drive up, their tire blows and they're forced to stop in a small town. A local mechanic offers to take them in his helicopter, but Gloria again refuses. Her and Jay get into a brief fight before he confesses that he actually wants his old teammates to see Gloria; he spent most of the season on the bench but wants to show off all he has now, including her. She agrees, and the three board the helicopter.

== Reception ==
=== Ratings ===
In its original American broadcast, "Planes, Trains and Cars" was watched by 10.06 million; slightly down from the previous episode, with an adult 18-49 rating/share of 4.0/11.

=== Reviews ===
The episode receive mixed reviews from critics.

Wyner C of Two Cents TV gave a good review to the episode saying that it was awesome. "This was an awesome episode!!! The first 15 minutes had so many one-liners! I don’t know how to choose my favorite. Great episode!! I laughed out loud at least 5 times."

Donna Bowman of The A.V. Club gave the episode a C rate, bemoaning the lack of a unifying theme between the three stories, and called the Mitchell and Cameron storyline "horrifyingly realistic".

Leigh Raines of TV Fanatic rated the episode with 4.5/5, summing up the overall episode by saying "coming off of an episode that I personally was not a fan of, I can honestly say that, while not sidesplittingly hilarious, this outing did leave me with a smile".

Christine N. Ziemba of Paste Magazine gave the episode 6.6/10 saying that the episode was overall "mediocre". She criticized the character of Gloria, stating that "we know that Gloria has often used her, ahem, assets to get what she wants, but it’s a little degrading to watch her objectified". Ziemba was also critical of Manny's role in the episode. She said "Manny wasn't quite himself either, turning from a sensitive old soul, who’s wise beyond his years, into a snotty brat".

Michael Adams of 411mania gave the episode 7/10. "I liked Mitchell this week. [...] The Cam/Mitchell story was minimal, however, it was very funny and touching and Mitch had a lot of great lines. [...] I also loved Mitchell's response when he thought Cam was yelling at him for calling the guy homeless. Good stuff. I think Jesse Tyler Ferguson will get an Emmy nomination this year, however, I don't think they've given him enough good material for the win. Shame."
