= Election Day (Modern Family) =

- Modern Family episode
- Episode no.: Season 3 Episode 19
- Directed by: Bryan Cranston
- Written by: Ben Karlin
- Production code: 3ARG20
- Original air date: April 11, 2012

Guest appearances
- Philip Baker Hall as Walt; Stephanie Faracy as Dottie; Melinda Page Hamilton as Sandy; Frank Wood as reporter; John Vickery as Cecil Van Gundy; Margaret Welsh as Laurie

Episode chronology
| ← Previous "Send Out the Clowns" | Next → "The Last Walt" |
- Modern Family season 3

"Election Day" is the 19th episode of the third season of the American sitcom Modern Family, and the series' 67th episode overall. This episode originally aired on ABC on April 11, 2012. It was written by Ben Karlin, and directed by Bryan Cranston.

== Plot ==
On Election Day, Claire (Julie Bowen) runs into a reporter who fails to recognize her as a candidate and loses a dental implant from an old figure skating injury while using her teeth to rip a tag from her blazer.

Cameron (Eric Stonestreet) and Mitchell (Jesse Tyler Ferguson) campaign in their Prius with a loud speaker they purchased second-hand from a taco truck. While driving around and encouraging people to vote for Claire using puns, Cam sees someone litter and uses the speaker to shame them into retrieving their garbage and throwing it into a trash can. The two realize there is power in the loud speaker and go around town shaming businesses that they feel have wronged them in mild ways. Eventually, they notice Sandy (Melinda Page Hamilton), whom they know from Lily's preschool, and gossip about how her fiancé is gay. When Sandy stares at them and approaches the car, they realize the button for the speaker was stuck and their conversation was broadcast to the entire street. They apologize and attempt to convince Sandy that her fiancé is straight, and are successful despite not truly believing it themselves.

Claire is being interviewed by a local radio station. After getting hit in the face with a microphone, she loses her replacement dental implant and sounds drunk the entire interview.

Phil (Ty Burrell) picks up his neighbor Walt (Philip Baker Hall) as one of fifty senior citizens he is going to drive to the polls. Walt suddenly realizes he needs Phil to pick up his glasses or else he won't be able to read his ballot. Worried about getting everyone else to the polls in time, Phil reluctantly agrees, but a series of additional errands needed by Walt result in Phil only having time to get Walt to the polls. There, Walt confesses that he doesn't actually want to vote for Claire, but will because Phil ran his errands.

Alex (Ariel Winter) is in charge of the phone banks being operated by her, Gloria (Sofía Vergara), Manny (Rico Rodriguez), Luke (Nolan Gould) and Haley (Sarah Hyland). Gloria finds it difficult to get people to listen to her, and her and Alex reflect that people are more inclined to listen to Gloria when they can see her. Luke makes impossible promises while Haley stresses about her four college rejection letters, how she is keeping them from her family, and has only one school left but is too afraid to open the letter; Manny fares decently well.

Jay (Ed O'Neill) expresses his excitement at the chance of voting for his daughter until he sees his ex is running the polls. He attempts to sneak around her, but she catches him and refuses to deposit his ballot.

That evening, everyone is gathered at the Dunphy house for an afterparty. Claire receives a call and reveals that she lost. The family, while being supportive, feels bad, with individual members silently blaming themselves for their campaign failures earlier in the day. Haley tearfully tells Claire her about the rejection letters. With the entire family present, Haley opens the final letter and discovers she's been waitlisted; the family is jubilant, partially because it is better than a rejection.

Claire receives a letter from Duane, boasting of his victory but also explaining he's given Claire the stop sign she initially wanted. When a driver runs it, Claire decides the neighborhood needs speed bumps.

== Reception ==
=== Ratings ===
In its original American broadcast, "Election Day" was watched by 10.35 million; down by 0.25 million from previous episode. The adult 18-49 rating/share was 4.2/11.

=== Reviews ===
Gloria's panic about Claire's loss was totally on base. "I don't want to be around when something that tight unravels" was just one of the many Modern Family quotes that made tonight's episode hilarious.

— Leigh Raines, TV Fanatic

The episode received positive reviews.

Donna Bowman of The A.V. Club gave and A− rate to the episode saying that it was one of the best episodes of the season. "Election Day sounds like just the thing to bring our Modern Family gang back from their hiatus, and back together for a classic-style ensemble episode. I’m happy to report that this promising premise isn’t wasted by the creative team and by guest director Bryan Cranston."

Leigh Raines of TV Fanatic rated the episode with 4.5/5, praising on Cameron, Mitchell, Gloria and Claire's troubling moments that made the episode "hilarious".

Christine N. Ziemba of Paste Magazine rated the episode with 8.9/10. "The show was really Claire Dunphy’s moment in the spotlight, and director Bryan Cranston—yes, that Bryan Cranston of Breaking Bad fame—allowed Julie Bowen to showcase her physical comedy prowess and Claire’s Type-A, ultra-competitive nature at her best (and worst)."

Michael Adams of 411mania rated the episode with 9/10 saying that it was great and praised Philip Baker Hall's character, Walt, who "stole" the episode. "Call him Walt, call him Mr.Kleezak, but this week, call him Character of the Week! In an episode where everyone had their moments and lots of funny stuff was happening, he was hands down the funniest part of the episode. His whole final segment about lamb and Obama was fantastic!"

Wyner C of Two Cents TV gave a good review to the episode saying that he loved it. "I LOVED this episode. Every one of their neuroses came out full force and they reconvened at the end of the episode. The best scenes are when they’re together."
