= Conception (film) =

- Directed by: Josh Stolberg
- Written by: Josh Stolberg
- Produced by: Leila Charles Leigh; Stephanie Sherrin; Josh Stolberg
- Starring: Pamela Adlon; David Arquette; Aaron Ashmore; Moon Bloodgood; Julie Bowen; Connie Britton; Jennifer Finnigan; Tim Griffin; Steve Howey; Sarah Hyland; Jennifer Jostyn; Leila Leigh; Jason Mantzoukas; America Olivo; Leah Pipes; Matt Prokop; Jonathan Silverman; Gregory Smith; Alan Tudyk
- Cinematography: Noah Rosenthal
- Edited by: Naomi Sunrise Filoramo
- Music by: Cody Westheimer
- Distributed by: Tribeca Film
- Release date: April 2011 (Newport Beach International Film Festival)
- Running time: 87 minutes
- Country: United States
- Language: English

Conception is a 2011 American comedy drama film written and directed by Josh Stolberg, with an ensemble cast including Pamela Adlon, David Arquette and Jason Mantzoukas. The film is produced by Leila Charles Leigh, Stephanie Sherrin, and Josh Stolberg for Rock It Productions.

== Plot ==
The film opens with a group of students wanting to know where babies come from and the teacher not knowing exactly how to explain. This bookends multiple scenes relating to conception that feature the experiences and complications of nine various and contrasting couples, some wishing for a baby, others shocked by the prospect and others with confused feelings.

== Cast ==
The Couples

- Alan Tudyk as Mark – married to Gwen, he insensitively pesters his wife for sex, who gave birth to their child six weeks prior.
- Jennifer Jostyn as Gwen – married to Mark, a sleep-deprived mother who recently gave birth; she is struggling with her sense of sexuality and self post birth.

- Jonathan Silverman as Brad – married to Laurie, they argue to keep his sex life going.
- Jennifer Finnigan as Laurie – married to Brad, they argue to keep her sex life going.

- America Olivo as Gina – married to Tommy, they also argue to keep their relationship going.
- Tim Griffin as Tommy – married to Gina, they also argue to keep their relationship going.

- Jason Mantzoukas as Brian – married to Gloria, he is squeamish about injecting his wife with hormones to help them conceive.
- Connie Britton as Gloria – married to Brian, she is a nurse who wants a baby.

- Moon Bloodgood as Nikki – partnered with Tay, they have a donated container of sperm for her to get pregnant.
- Pamela Adlon as Tay – Nikki's partner.

- Sarah Hyland as Tracey – partner of J.T.’s, a girl who trades her virginity for J.T.'s vow to eat vegetarian.
- Matt Prokop as J.T. – partner of Tracey, vows to eat vegetarian to have sex with Tracey.

- Julie Bowen as Tiffany – a divorcee with a daughter, who asks her partner, Will, to make a sex tape.
- Gregory Smith as Will – a much younger partner of Tiffany’s.

- Aaron Ashmore as Eric – partner with Carla, they are on the verge of a breakup due to his bad habits.
- Leah Pipes as Carla – partner of Eric.

- Steve Howey as Joel – paired with Bree, they are on a blind date together.
- Leila Leigh as Bree – paired with Joel.

Other Cast:

- David Arquette as Paul Reynolds – an elementary school teacher
- Caitlin Carmichael as Lucy
- Michelle Coyle as Mabel
- DJ Sauceda as Dylan
- Caleb Alexander Cohen as Interview Kid
- Jacob Nathaniel as Art school student
- Isabella Cuda as Interview girl
- Xander Stolberg as Alex
- Jason Schmidt as Best Friend
- Asher Stolberg as Reggie

== Critical reception ==
In his review of Conception for Variety, Dennis Harvey considered that "There are a lot of attractive, likable thesps here, but their material is just so-so. Most of the sketch-like storylines just hit the same note over and over, without the kind of bright dialogue or offbeat twists that might make them pop."

Reviewing Conception for The Hollywood Reporter, Kirk Honeycutt wrote, "Writer-director Josh Stolberg ... keeps the pace brisk yet allows each couple enough time for soul searching or intense confrontations to highlight the nature of their relationships."

Francis Rizzo III of DVD Talk rated Conception three and a half stars from five, commenting, "Stolberg manages an impressive feat by bringing together these tales in a way that keeps you engaged ... Fans of character studies should definitely give it a look, and if you enjoy Mantzoukas, it's a must see."
