= Neal McDonough =

American actor (born 1966)

- McDonough in 2026
- Born: February 13, 1966 (age 60); Dorchester, Massachusetts, U.S.
- Education: Syracuse University (BFA); London Academy of Music and Dramatic Art
- Occupation: Actor
- Years active: 1990–present
- Spouse: Ruvé Robertson (m. 2003)
- Children: 5

Neal McDonough (born February 13, 1966) is an American actor. He is best known for his portrayal of Lieutenant Lynn "Buck" Compton in the HBO miniseries Band of Brothers (2001), Fletcher in Minority Report (2002), Tin Man in the Sci-Fi Channel miniseries Tin Man (2007), Timothy "Dum Dum" Dugan in Captain America: The First Avenger (2011), and Damien Darhk in The CW series Arrow (2015–2016) and various series in the DC Arrowverse (2015–2022). He also played the lead role in “Homestead” (2024)

Other film appearances include Star Trek: First Contact (1996), Ravenous (1999), Flags of Our Fathers (2006), Paul Blart: Mall Cop 2 (2015), and Sonic the Hedgehog (2020). He has also written and produced films in which he has acted, such as The Last Rodeo (2025). Further major television roles include the voice of Bruce Banner in the animated The Incredible Hulk (1996–1997), Deputy District Attorney David McNorris in Boomtown (2002–2003), Dave Williams in Desperate Housewives (2008–2009), Robert Quarles in Justified (2012), Sean Cahill in Suits (2014–2019), and Cal Thresher in Tulsa King (2024–2026).

== Early life and education ==
McDonough was born in Dorchester, Massachusetts, on February 13, 1966, the son of Catherine (née Bushe) and Frank McDonough, motel owners who emigrated from Ireland, with his mother coming from County Tipperary and his father from County Galway. McDonough grew up in Barnstable, Massachusetts and was raised Catholic. His childhood nickname was "Headster", which McDonough says originated in his brothers' teasing him about the size of his head. He graduated from Barnstable High School, and attended Syracuse University, where he was initiated and became a member of the Sigma Chi Fraternity and graduated with a Bachelor of Fine Arts degree in 1988. He had obtained several college scholarships to play baseball, but decided to go to Syracuse, as he thought it had the best theater department. McDonough furthered his classical theatre training at the London Academy of Music and Dramatic Art.

== Career ==
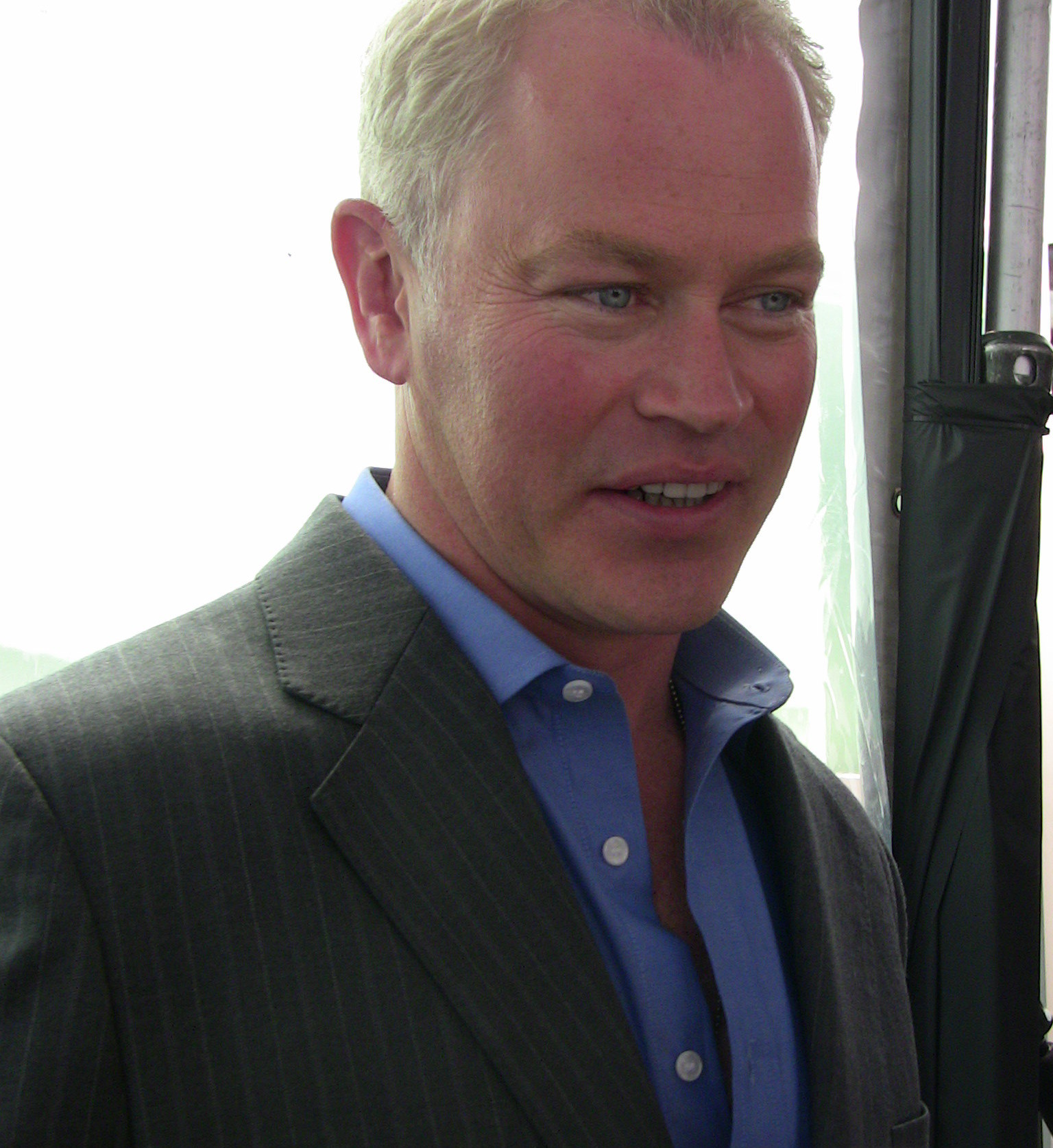
McDonough in 2009

McDonough has starred in many tv-shows and films including Band of Brothers, Boomtown, Star Trek: First Contact, Minority Report and The Hitcher. McDonough played Dave Williams on the fifth season of Desperate Housewives. He also starred in the lead role on 2004 medical drama Medical Investigation for its one full season.

In 1996, McDonough voiced Bruce Banner in the animated television series The Incredible Hulk which ran for two seasons. He later reprised the role in the 2005 video game The Incredible Hulk: Ultimate Destruction.

McDonough was set to star in the ABC dramedy Scoundrels, but was fired for refusing to act in sex scenes, citing his family and Catholic faith as basis for his decision.

McDonough portrays Jesus in "The Truth & Life Dramatized Audio New Testament Bible," a dramatized audio New Testament which uses the Catholic edition of the Revised Standard Version of the Bible.

In 2011, McDonough appeared as Timothy "Dum Dum" Dugan in Captain America: The First Avenger. McDonough also voiced the character in the 2011 video game Captain America: Super Soldier. He has reprised his role four times since then: in the 2013 short film, Agent Carter; in the first episode of the second season of Agents of S.H.I.E.L.D. (2014); in an episode of the Agent Carter television series (2015); and as an alternate version in an episode of the What If...? television series (2021).

In 2012, McDonough had a recurring role in the third season of FX's Justified as Robert Quarles, a sadistic carpetbagging mobster from Detroit. He was later cast as Police Chief Parker in Frank Darabont's TNT pilot Mob City.

During the 2014 Winter Olympics opening ceremony on NBC, McDonough was featured in a high-profile and frequently aired Poolside commercial for the Cadillac ELR hybrid electric car.

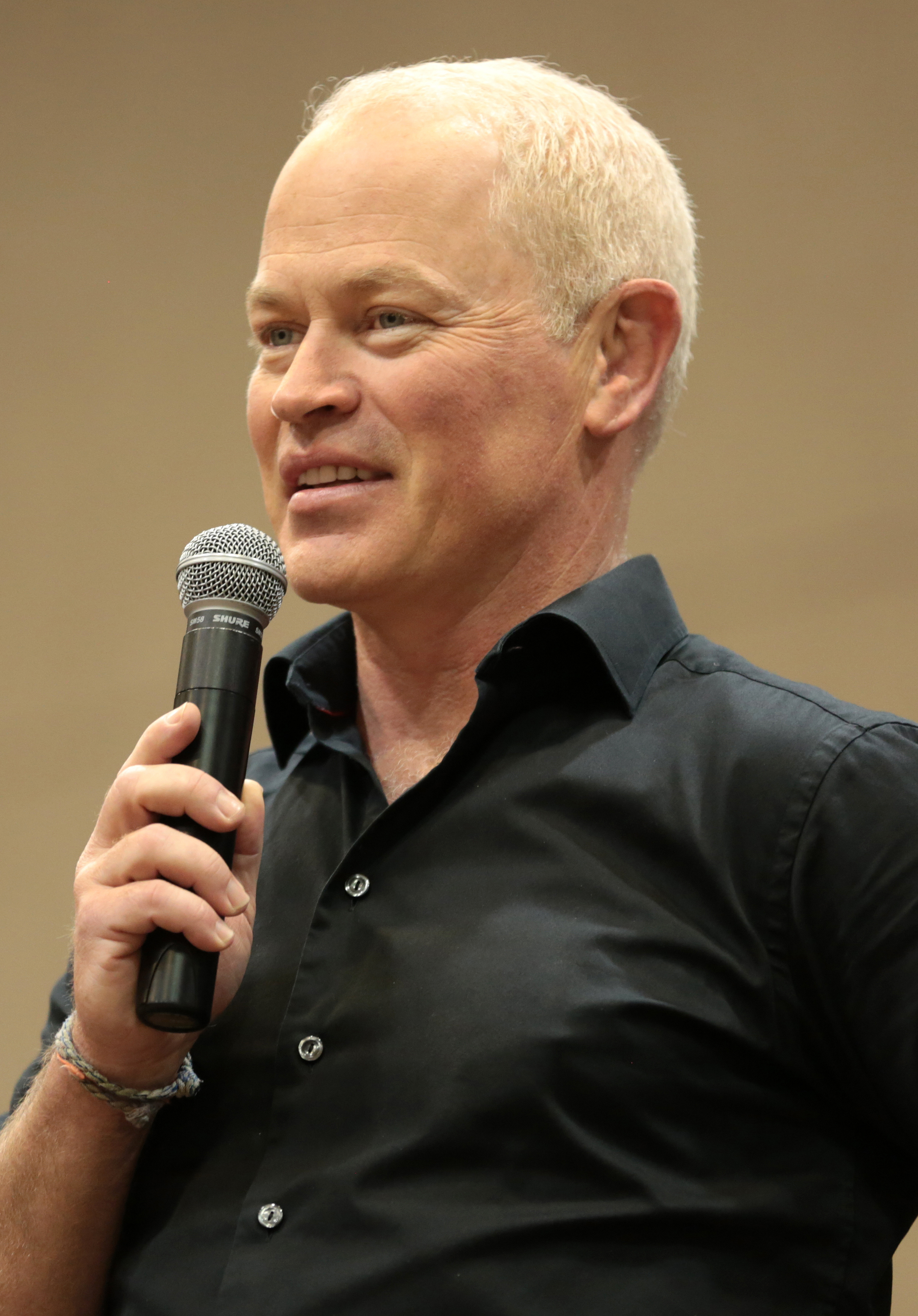
McDonough in 2017

In 2015, McDonough was cast as DC Comics villain Damien Darhk on the fourth season of Arrow.

In 2021, he was cast as President Dwight D. Eisenhower on the tenth season of American Horror Story, titled Double Feature. He is a main cast member for the second part of the season. The same year, he also portrayed the character Dr. William Birkin in a live-action film adaptation of the first two Resident Evil games, entitled Resident Evil: Welcome to Raccoon City. He also played a small role as a side villain Anders in The 100.

In 2022, McDonough was a guest artist and narrator for the 2022 annual Tabernacle Choir Christmas Program.

Throughout his career, McDonough has enjoyed recognition for his various character roles in both film and television, as well as for his voice work in animation and video games. As a result of these accolades, he is especially considered one of the best "bad guy character actors" in the industry.

== Personal life ==
McDonough is a devout Catholic. In 2003, McDonough married Ruvé Robertson, a South African model whom he met in the United Kingdom while filming Band of Brothers. They have five children.

McDonough has stated that he refuses to perform sex scenes and kiss female co-stars because of his faith and respect for his wife. In 2010, he was written out of a million-dollar role in the TV series Scoundrels for his refusal to perform sex scenes.

McDonough is a Republican, and revealed his political beliefs during his eulogy at Buck Compton's funeral.

== Filmography ==
=== Film ===
Year	Title	Role	Notes
1990	Darkman	Dockworker #2	
1994	Angels in the Outfield	Whit Bass	
1995	Three Wishes	Policeman	
1995	One Tough Bastard	Agent Ward	
1996	Star Trek: First Contact	Lt. Hawk	
1997	Fire Down Below	Truck Driver at Truck Stop	
1997	Circles	Brian Miano	
1999	A Perfect Little Man	Billy Morrisson	
1999	Ravenous	Reich	
1999	You're Killing Me...	Peter Gish	
2002	Minority Report	Officer Gordon "Fletch" Fletcher	
2003	Timeline	Frank Gordon	
2003	They Call Him Sasquatch	Ned Dwyer	
2004	Walking Tall	Jay Hamilton	
2006	The Guardian	Chief Petty Officer Jack Skinner	
2006	The Last Time	Hurly	
2006	Flags of Our Fathers	Captain Dave Severance	
2006	Machine	Jack Ford	
2007	The Hitcher	Lieutenant Esteridge	
2007	I Know Who Killed Me	Daniel Fleming	
2008	Forever Strong	Coach Richard Penning	
2008	88 Minutes	Jon Forster	
2008	Traitor	FBI Agent Max Archer	
2009	Street Fighter: The Legend of Chun-Li	M. Bison	
2010	DC Showcase: Green Arrow	Green Arrow / Oliver Queen	Voice; short film
2011	Little Birds	Hogan	
2011	Ticking Clock	James Keene	
2011	Captain America: The First Avenger	Timothy "Dum Dum" Dugan	
2012	The Philly Kid	Jim "L.A. Jim" Jacoby	
2013	Company of Heroes	Lieutenant Joe Conti	Direct-to-video
2013	The Marine 3: Homefront	Jonah Pope	Direct-to-video
2013	Red 2	Jack Horton	
2013	Agent Carter	Timothy "Dum Dum" Dugan	Short film
2014	Bad Country	Kiersey	
2014	Batman: Assault on Arkham	Floyd Lawton / Deadshot	Voice; direct-to-video
2014	Falcon Rising	Manny Ridley	
2015	Paul Blart: Mall Cop 2	Vincent Sofel	
2015	The Unspoken	Officer Bower	
2016	Greater	Marty Burlsworth	Also executive producer
2017	1922	Harlan Cotterie	
2018	Proud Mary	Walter	
2018	Game Over, Man!	Conrad Drothers	
2019	Buddy Games	Himself	
2020	Sonic the Hedgehog	Major Bennington	
2020	The Warrant	John Breaker	Also executive producer
2020	Red Stone	Boon	Also executive producer
2020	Monsters of Man	Major	
2021	Apex	Samuel Rainsford	
2021	Resident Evil: Welcome to Raccoon City	William Birkin	
2021	Red Stone	Boon	Also writer and producer
2022	Boon	Boon	Also writer and producer
2022	There Are No Saints	Vincent	
2022	Left Behind: Rise of the Antichrist	Jonathan Stonagal	
2022	O Holy Night	Guest Narrator	Also a live Christmas album
2023	The Shift	The Benefactor	
2023	Holiday Twist	Skip	
2023	Soul Mates	Matchmaker	
2023	The Warrant: Breaker's Law	John Breaker	
2024	Outlaw Posse	Bart	
2024	Homestead	Ian Ross	
2025	Skillhouse	Brandon Vega	
2025	The Last Rodeo	Joe Wainright	Also writer and producer
2025	Guns & Moses	Mayor Donovan Kirk	
2025	The Gettysburg Address	Charles Sumner	Voice; documentary
2026	Twisted	Bradshaw	
2026	Jimmy	Alexander Stewart	
2026	Angel and the Badman	Laredo	
TBA	Black Spartans	TBA	Post-production

=== Television ===
Year	Title	Role	Notes
1991	China Beach	Lurch	Episode: "Hello Goodbye"
1991	Quantum Leap	Chucky	Episode: "Play Ball"
1991	Babe Ruth	Lou Gehrig	Television film
1993	In the Line of Duty: Ambush in Waco	Jason	Television film
1994	Duckman	IRS Agent	Voice, episode: "Not So Easy Riders"
1994	Aaahh!!! Real Monsters	Cameraman, Monster	Voice, episode: "Krumm Goes Hollywood"
1995	Blue River	Edward Sellars	Television film
1995	JAG	Second Lieutenant Jay Williams	Episode "Desert Son"
1995	White Dwarf	Dr. Driscoll Rampart III	Television film
1995	Iron Man	Firebrand	Voice, episode: "Fire and Rain"
1996	Murphy Brown	Clive Walker	Episode: "If You're Going to Talk the Talk"
1996	NYPD Blue	Jerry Selness	Episode: "He's Not Guilty, He's My Brother"
1996–1997	The Incredible Hulk	Bruce Banner	Voice, 21 episodes
1997	Invasion	Randy North	TV miniseries
1998	Diagnosis: Murder	Ross Canin	2 episodes
1999	Martial Law	Kyle Strode	4 episodes
1999	Balloon Farm	Sheriff	Television film
1999	Just Shoot Me!	Craig	Episode: "Shaking Private Trainer"
1999	Profiler	Christoper Langston	Episode: "To Serve and Protect"
2001	Band of Brothers	First Lieutenant Lynn "Buck" Compton	8 episodes
2002	The X-Files	Agent Comer	2 episodes
2002–2003	Boomtown	L.A. Deputy D.A. David McNorris	24 episodes
2004–2005	Medical Investigation	Dr. Stephen Connor	20 episodes
2007	Traveler	Secretary of Homeland Security Jack Freed	6 episodes
2007	Tin Man	Wyatt Cain (Tin Man)	3 episodes
2008–2009	Desperate Housewives	Dave Williams	24 episodes
2010	Terriers	Ford / Tom Cutshaw	2 episodes
2011	Law & Order: Criminal Intent	Monsignor McTeal	Episode: "The Consoler"
2012	Justified	Robert Quarles	13 episodes
2012	CSI: NY	Senator Gordon Hamilton	Episode: "Unspoken"
2012	Perception	Fredrick James Dafoe	Episode: "Cipher"
2013	CSI: Crime Scene Investigation	Tommy Barnes	Episode: "Sheltered"
2013	Mob City	Captain Bill Parker	6 episodes
2014–2019	Suits	Sean Cahill	17 episodes
2014	Agents of S.H.I.E.L.D.	Timothy "Dum Dum" Dugan	Episode: "Shadows"
2015	Agent Carter	Timothy "Dum Dum" Dugan	Episode: "The Iron Ceiling"
2015	Public Morals	Rusty Patton	9 episodes
2015–2016	Arrow	Damien Darhk	20 episodes
2015–2022	The Flash	Damien Darhk	4 episodes
2016–2020	Legends of Tomorrow	Damien Darhk	21 episodes
2017	Rogue	Casey Oaks	5 episodes
2017	Survivor's Remorse	Brian	Episode: "Repercussions"
2018–2021	Van Helsing	Hansen / Willem	9 episodes
2019–2020	Project Blue Book	General James Harding	18 episodes
2019	Yellowstone	Malcolm Beck	6 episodes
2020	Altered Carbon	Konrad Harlan	3 episodes
2020	The 100	Anders	5 episodes
2021	What If...?	Timothy "Dum Dum" Dugan	Voice, episode: "What If... Captain Carter Were the First Avenger?"
2021	American Horror Story: Double Feature	Dwight D. Eisenhower	4 episodes
2022	9-1-1: Lone Star	Sergeant Ty O'Brien	7 episodes
2024–2026	Tulsa King	Cal Thresher	18 episodes
2026	Hope Valley: 1874	Commissioner French	1 episode

=== Music videos ===
Year	Title	Artist(s)	Role	Ref.
2026	"Do Me Right"	Mr. Fantasy	Himself	

=== Video games ===
Year	Title	Voice role	Notes
2005	The Incredible Hulk: Ultimate Destruction	Bruce Banner	
2009	Rogue Warrior	Admiral Travis Payton	
2011	Captain America: Super Soldier	Timothy 'Dum Dum' Dugan	
2013	Injustice: Gods Among Us	The Flash, Damian Wayne / Nightwing, Regime Soldier #2	
2015	Skylanders: SuperChargers	Astroblast	
2015	Call of Duty: Black Ops III	Jack Vincent	Also likeness

=== Internet ===
Year	Title	Role	Notes
2015	If Angels In The Outfield Happened For Real (30 For 30 Parody)	Whit Bass	CollegeHumor sketch

== Awards and nominations ==
Year	Award	Award category	Title of work	Result
1999	Atlantic City Film Festival	Best Actor (Jury Award)	A Perfect Little Man	Won
1999	Online Film & Television Association Award	Best Supporting Actor in a Drama Series	Boomtown	Nominated
1999	Television Critics Association Award	Individual Achievement in Drama	Boomtown	Nominated
1999	Satellite Award	Best Supporting Actor in a Television Series – Drama	Boomtown	Won
2008	Screen Actors Guild Award	Outstanding Performance by an Ensemble in a Comedy Series	Desperate Housewives	Nominated
2012	Critics' Choice Television Award	Best Supporting Actor in a Drama Series	Justified	Nominated
2012	Satellite Award	Best Supporting Actor in a Series, Miniseries or Television Film	Justified	Won
