= See You in Valhalla =

- Directed by: Jarret Tarnol
- Written by: Brent A. Tarnol
- Produced by: Jarret Tarnol; Brent A. Tarnol; Sarah Hyland; Joseph D. Carella; Bernie Gewissler; Matt Prokop
- Starring: Sarah Hyland; Steve Howey; Odeya Rush; Bret Harrison; Emma Bell
- Cinematography: Gavin Kelly
- Edited by: Joseph D. Carella
- Music by: 10K Islands
- Production company: Tarnol Group Pictures
- Distributed by: ARC Entertainment, SC Movies
- Release date: April 24, 2015
- Running time: 82 minutes
- Country: United States
- Language: English

See You in Valhalla is a 2015 American drama film written by Brent A. Tarnol and directed by Jarret Tarnol and starring Sarah Hyland, Steve Howey, Odeya Rush, Bret Harrison, and Emma Bell.

== Plot ==
After the bizarre death of her brother, Johanna Burwood must return home after four years, to face her strange siblings, her out-of-touch father and her very touchy past.

== Cast ==
- Sarah Hyland as Johana Burwood
- Bret Harrison as Barry Burwood
- Steve Howey as Makewi
- Odeya Rush as Ashley Burwood
- Jake McDorman as Magnus Burwood
- Michael Weston as Don Burwood
- Conor O'Farrell as Woody Burwood
- Alex Frost as Peter
- Emma Bell as Faye
- Beau Mirchoff as Johnny
- Allie Gonino as Tori
