= Geek Charming =

American TV movie

- Film poster
- Based on: Geek Charming by Robin Palmer
- Screenplay by: Elizabeth Hackett; Hilary Galanoy
- Directed by: Jeffrey Hornaday
- Starring: Sarah Hyland; Matt Prokop; Sasha Pieterse; Jordan Jedediah Nichols; Vanessa Morgan; Lili Simmons
- Music by: Nathan Wang
- Country of origin: United States
- Original language: English

Production
- Executive producers: David Hoberman; Todd Lieberman; Paul E. Shapiro
- Producer: Tracey Jeffrey
- Cinematography: Robert Brinkmann
- Editor: David Finfer
- Running time: 94 minutes
- Production companies: Bad Angels Productions; Mandeville Films

Original release
- Network: Disney Channel
- Release: November 11, 2011

Geek Charming is a 2011 American teen comedy-drama film released as a Disney Channel Original Movie. It was directed by Jeffrey Hornaday from a screenplay by Elizabeth Hackett and Hilary Galanoy, and based on the novel of the same name by Robin Palmer. The film stars Sarah Hyland and Matt Prokop. It premiered on November 11, 2011, on Disney Channel, on January 27, 2012, on Disney Channel (UK & Ireland), and on January 28, 2012, on Disney Channel Asia. The premiere was watched by 4.9 million viewers, the fifth largest number for a cable show of that week.

== Plot ==
In Washington, Dylan Schoenfield is the most popular girl at Woodlands Academy. After accidentally dropping her expensive handbag into a mall fountain, she is surprised when classmate and film enthusiast Josh Rosen retrieves it. In exchange, Dylan agrees to be the subject of Josh's documentary about high school popularity. Hoping the film will boost her campaign to become Blossom Queen, Dylan initially cooperates, but her diva behavior leads to an argument, and Josh removes her from the project.

Determined to make amends, Dylan spends time with Josh and his friends watching a film, after which Josh reinstates her in the documentary. During a visit to Dylan's house, Josh learns that her late mother was crowned Blossom Queen in 1985, revealing Dylan's emotional connection to the title. As the two grow closer, Josh's film club friends resent his increasing time with Dylan, suspecting a crush he denies. When Josh forgets about a math competition to go on a date with another girl, Amy, he seeks Dylan's advice on how to impress her. Dylan invites them to a party hosted by her boyfriend, Asher, but Amy feels out of place. Asher grows jealous, assuming Dylan and Josh are secretly involved. Amy later rejects Josh's invitation to the spring formal, suggesting that his real interest lies with Dylan.

Dylan's social life soon unravels: Asher breaks up with her for "acting like a nerd", and her best friends abandon her when she loses her social status. Meanwhile, Josh's friends replace him as film club president. At the documentary's premiere, Dylan expects the film to improve her popularity, but is humiliated when the audience laughs at her shallow behavior. Believing Josh betrayed her, she storms out before seeing the film's ending, which includes his heartfelt praise of her personal growth.

The next morning, Amy visits Dylan and convinces her to watch the entire film, explaining that it actually portrays her positively. That night at the Spring Formal, Dylan arrives wearing her mother's dress. To her surprise, she is crowned Blossom Queen, just as her mother had been. On stage, Dylan delivers an emotional speech, apologizing for her past behavior and expressing gratitude to Josh and Amy. Afterward, Dylan and Josh reconcile and share a kiss, now fully appreciating each other for who they are.

== Cast ==
- Sarah Hyland as Dylan Schoenfield, the snobby, wealthy and popular girl at Woodlands Academy, who is a reformed dork, who aims to win the Blossom Queen status, following in her late mother's footsteps; Josh's love interest turn girlfriend.
- Matt Prokop as Josh Rosen, the film geek at Woodlands Academy, who wants to take on a challenge to film a documentary, regarding the truth about popularity; Dylan's love interest turn boyfriend.
- Sasha Pieterse as Amy Loubalu, Dylan's estranged friend and Josh's former love interest.
- Jordan Jedediah Nichols as Asher Dumentz, Dylan's former jock boyfriend.
- Vanessa Morgan as Hannah Mornell, Dylan's lackey, who can sometimes be sweeter than Lola, by nature. Hannah is described as extremely intelligent in the book and wants to get into a decent college, making her a bit of a nerd herself.
- Lili Simmons as Lola Leighton, Dylan's lackey. Although she is extremely loyal to Dylan, Lola thinks Dylan is just a drama queen, who stresses too much.
- David Del Rio as Ari, Josh's friend.
- Jimmy Bellinger as Steven, Josh's other friend.
- Lilli Birdsell as Sandy Rosen, Josh's mother.
- Andrew Airlie as Alan Schoenfield, Dylan's father.
- Kacey Rohl as Caitlin Raven, Josh's friend who has a crush on him and Steven's love interest.
- Andrea Brooks as Nicole Patterson, Dylan's rival and arch enemy for Blossom Queen. The head cheerleader at Woodlands Academy, she lands Asher from Dylan and thinks that Dylan is no match for her popularity.

== Songs ==
- "Hey Princess" by Allstar Weekend
- "Words" by Doves
- "The William Tell Overture Theme Music" by The Orchestral Academy Band Of Los Angeles California

== Production ==
Robin Palmer, the author of the original novel, was not involved in production and refused to read the script due to her background of adapting novels into films. The movie was shot in Vancouver, Canada and at St. George's School. The final scene was filmed near Broadway Ave.

== Reception ==
It premiered on Friday, November 11, 2011, on Disney Channel and earned 4.910 million viewers.

=== Accolades ===
Award	Date of ceremony	Category	Recipient(s)	Result	Ref.
Directors Guild of America Awards	January 28, 2012	Outstanding Directing – Children's Programs	Jeffrey Hornaday	Nominated	

== Home media ==
The film was released on DVD in the USA on February 7, 2012. It features 10 bonus episodes of Shake It Up and is a 2-disc set.

The film was released in the UK on April 23, 2012, alongside Frenemies.
