= The Warrant: Breaker's Law =

The Warrant: Breakers Law
- Release poster
- Directed by: Brent Christy
- Written by: Shea Sizemore
- Starring: Dermot Mulroney; Bruce Boxleitner; Neal McDonough
- Production companies: Imagicomm Entertainment; INSP Films
- Release date: April 18, 2023
- Country: United States
- Language: English

The Warrant: Breaker's Law is a 2023 American Western film. It is the sequel to The Warrant, with Neal McDonough returning as Sheriff John Breaker.

A trailer for the film came out in early 2023, before it was released on Vudu in April 2023. It was nominated for a Golden Nymph Award in the fiction category in 2023.

== Plot ==
The story continues on from the original film, following the life of John Breaker, played by Neal McDonough. The next instalment of Breaker's career is set in the 1870s, with him now serving as Federal Marshal. He sets out with good friend and Deputy Marshal, Bugle Bearclaw, to deliver a warrant to Henry Bronson. Bronson spent years evading the authorities after years of criminal activity. After capturing Bronson they start the journey to deliver him to the local Marshal. Things don't go to plan after they realise Bronson is the estranged brother of the notorious outlaw, Yule Bronson.

Yule Bronson (played by Dermot Mulroney) has been terrorizing the town where the local Marshal is based, Absolem's Hill. On the arrival of Breaker, Bearclaw, and Yule's estranged brother, the story takes various twists and turns as the group of Marshals try to find a way to solve the dispute. John Breaker's family connections are also pulled into the affair.

== Main cast ==
- Dermot Mulroney as Yule Bronson
- Bruce Boxleitner as Judge Thaddeus
- Neal McDonough as John Breaker
- Nick Searcy as Colonel Dredge
- Jackson Kelly as Brig Farkus
- Amy Hargreaves as Charlotte
- Gregory Cruz as Bugle Bearclaw
- Tom Proctor as Rogue Watson
- John Patrick Jordan as Rufus McGillicuddy
- Prima Apollinaare as Francesca

== Release & accolades ==
Breaker's Law was officially released on Vudu on April 18, 2023. It has a scheduled DVD release date of May 30, 2023.

In May 2023, Breaker's Law was nominated for a Golden Nymph Award in the Fiction category at the Monte-Carlo Television Festival.
