= Jennifer Jostyn =

American actress (born 1968)

- Occupation: Actress
- Years active: 1988–2018

Jennifer Jostyn is an American former actress.

== Career ==
She has appeared in many movies since the early 1990s, including House of 1000 Corpses, The Brothers McMullen, Milo, Omega Cop, Focus, Dr. Benny, A Perfect Little Man, Rancid, and The Life Coach, a movie she also wrote and produced. Additionally, Jostyn has had various guest starring roles on television, including ER, The Drew Carey Show, Gilmore Girls, and Come to Papa. Part of her career has entailed doing work in commercials, one of the most notable of which was her role of a dancer in Madonna's 1989 Like a Prayer Pepsi commercial.

== Filmography ==
=== Film ===
Year	Title	Role	Notes
1988	Vampire on Bikini Beach	Wynette	Direct-to-video
1990	Omega Cop	Zoe	
1995	The Brothers McMullen	Leslie	
1997	Midnight Blue	Barbara	
1997	Cold Around the Heart	Waitress Inez	
1997	The First to Go	Terry	
1997	Circles	Kelly Garner	
1998	Milo	Claire Mullins	
1998	Deep Impact	Mariette Monash	
1998	Telling You	Beth Taylor	
1999	A Perfect Little Man	Mindy	
2001	Shot	Sidney	
2003	House of 1000 Corpses	Mary Knowles	
2003	Dr. Benny	Becky	
2003	Written in Blood	Stacy	
2003	Maximum Velocity	Karen Briggs	
2004	Rancid	Det. Olsen	
2005	The Life Coach	Sunshine Hilton	Also writer and producer
2011	Conception	Grace	
2014	The Opposite Sex	Regina	
2018	Blood Bride	Nurse Betty	Short film

=== Television ===
Year	Title	Role	Notes
1997	Fired Up	Didi	Episode: "The Baby-Sitter's Club"
1999	What We Did That Night	Cloe Larson	Television film
1999	Vanished Without a Trace	Karen	Television film
2002	Gilmore Girls	Judy	Episode: "Take the Deviled Eggs..."
2003	ER	Prosthetist	2 episodes
2004	The Drew Carey Show	April	Episode: "Eye of the Leopard"
2004	Come to Papa	Sue	Episode: "The Pep Talk"
2005	NYPD Blue	Teresa Donatelli	Episode: "Lenny Scissorhands"
2009	Scrubs	Dr. Simmons	Episode: "My Saving Grace"
2011	American Horror Story	Ronni	Episode: "Murder House"
2012	Parenthood	Nurse	Episode: "Remember Me, I'm the One Who Loves You"
2013	Nashville	Esme	Episode: "Take These Chains from My Heart"
