= A Perfect Little Man =

- Directed by: Jeff Hare
- Written by: Jeff Hare
- Starring: Neal McDonough
- Release date: 1999
- Running time: 46 minutes
- Country: United States
- Language: English

A Perfect Little Man is a 1999 American independent short drama film directed and written by Jeff Hare starring Neal McDonough as "Billy Morrisson", Tom Hale as "Michael", Jennifer Jostyn as "Mindy", Doug Kruse as "Sid", Michael A. LeMelle as "Young Billy", Dana Lewis as "Ruth Morrison", Tegan West as "Jack Morrison", Peter John White as the "sleazy guy", and Delaine Yates as "Laura".

== Awards ==
At the Atlantic City Film Festival, A Perfect Little Man got the Jury Award, with recipients including Neal McDonough for "Best Actor" and Jeff Hare for "Best Director - Short Film".
