= The Warrant =

- Directed by: Brent Christy
- Written by: Shea Sizemore
- Starring: Neal McDonough; Steven R. McQueen; Casper Van Dien
- Production company: INSP Films
- Release date: June 20, 2020
- Country: United States
- Language: English

The Warrant is a 2020 American Western-themed film. The film stars Steven R. McQueen and Neal McDonough as a father and son duo, who dedicate their lives to upholding the law. A sequel to the film titled The Warrant: Breaker's Law, was announced in 2022.

== Plot ==
The Warrant is set in a post-civil war America. The plot follows John Breaker, played by Neal McDonough, who served in the American Civil War before becoming a local sheriff, along with his son, Cal Breaker, a Federal Marshal, played by Steven R. McQueen. Together they set out on a mission to serve an arrest warrant to a well-known vigilante, Virgil St. Denis, played by Casper Van Dien. St. Denis goes by the name of "The Saint" and, like John Breaker, was a war veteran.

The task becomes seemingly impossible when the Breakers get caught between two rival gangs, which could reignite the Civil War. It was described by Casper Van Dien as "a wholesome Western; it felt like a classic Western".

== Main cast ==
- Neal McDonough as John Breaker
- Steven R. McQueen as Cal Breaker
- Casper Van Dien as Virgil St. Denis (The Saint)
- Annabeth Gish as Bonnie Breaker
- Gregory Cruz as Bugle Bearclaw
- Greg Perrow as Deputy Shanks
- Roxanna Dunlop as Stacey Snyder
- Esteban Cueto as Anvil Anyang
- Trace Cheramie as George Washington Jr.
- Gregory Alan Williams as Tucker Macready

== Sequel ==
In 2022, it was announced that Neal McDonough and INSP Films would produce and star in a sequel, The Warrant: Breaker's Law. Dermot Mulroney would also star in the film.
