= Furry Vengeance =

2010 film by Roger Kumble

- Theatrical release poster
- Directed by: Roger Kumble
- Written by: Michael Carnes; Josh Gilbert
- Produced by: Robert Simonds; Keith Goldberg
- Starring: Brendan Fraser; Brooke Shields; Ken Jeong
- Cinematography: Peter Lyons Collister
- Edited by: Lawrence Jordan
- Music by: Edward Shearmur
- Production companies: Participant Media; Imagenation Abu Dhabi; Robert Simonds Productions
- Distributed by: Summit Entertainment
- Release date: April 30, 2010
- Running time: 91 minutes
- Country: United States
- Language: English
- Budget: $35 million
- Box office: $39 million

Furry Vengeance is a 2010 family comedy film directed by Roger Kumble and written by Michael Carnes and Josh Gilbert. It stars Brendan Fraser, Brooke Shields, and Ken Jeong. The film tells the story of a real estate developer charged with changing a forest into a residential community, which evokes the wrath of local forest animals.

Furry Vengeance was theatrically released on April 30, 2010, by Summit Entertainment. The film was a box-office disappointment, earning $39 million on a $35 million budget, and received generally negative reviews from critics.

== Plot ==
In the wilderness of Oregon, a prairie dog screams after Riggs, a worker, drives past and throws a cigar at it while talking to Lyman Enterprise CEO Neal Lyman on the phone while planning to check up on co-worker Dan Sanders. This causes a raccoon to signal a mink to release a boulder that pushes Riggs' car to the edge of a cliff, teetering back and forth. After that, the raccoon throws the cigar back to Riggs who yells "You're a bad raccoon!" The raccoon then blows the car down the cliff. Riggs is then heard calling up Lyman to tell him that he quits.

Dan Sanders is a real estate developer from Chicago and nature lover who meets with Lyman who gives Dan the task of turning the forest of Rocky Springs into a residential development after Riggs' instant resignation. This all transpires much to the objections of Dan's son Tyler and wife Tammy who are unhappy in Rocky Springs while missing their lives in Chicago.

Unfortunately for Dan, the animals who are led by the raccoon refuse to sit back and watch their forest being destroyed. They manage to turn the tables on him by disturbing his progress, interrupting his meetings, and humiliating him. Upon receiving some research from his love interest Amber, Tyler tells his father that Rocky Springs is a forest reserve where he warns his father that "many have tried to settle Rocky Springs but they all failed." Following an attack by a grizzly bear that traps him in a tipped over portable toilet, Dan signs orders to have a drill sergeant capture and cage all the animals.

Meanwhile, Tammy is forced to plan an "eco-friendly" fair with a senile teacher Mrs. Martin at the high school which is sponsored by Lyman Enterprises, unaware of Lyman's plans to cut down the forest to build houses and a shopping mall "with a forest theme". Figuring this out and the fact that Neal lied about planning to send the animals to a nature preserve, Dan decides to set the animals free. Once released, the raccoon and his friends immediately wreak havoc on the eco-fair, causing the guests and entertainers to flee while Mrs. Martin (who doesn't seem to give a care about what's going on around her) talks to an owl.

Lyman accidentally tranquilizes the sponsor for the construction named Mr. Gupta after he attempted to break their deal. He flees into a worm tunnel with the animals in close pursuit. The animals begin attacking him as the bear drives a golf cart, pulling the tunnel away into the forest. After some convincing from Amber and Tammy, Tyler finally tells his father that he loves him.

Three months later, the forest is reclaimed as a nature preserve with Dan working as a park ranger. The poster promoting the forest preservation also states that anyone who violates the rules will be fined $1 million.

During the credits, the humans and animals dance to the Transcenders version of "Insane in the Brain."

== Cast ==
- Brendan Fraser as Dan Sanders, a real estate developer.
  - Fraser also appears uncredited as Tuka the Caveman, Sigrid the Viking, Jedediah the Puritan, and Terrence the Hippie, characters from Rocky Springs' folklore that had issues with the Raccoon's ancestors when they tried to settle Rocky Springs.
- Brooke Shields as Tammy Sanders, the wife of Dan who works as a teacher. Although initially skeptical due to Furry Vengeance being an animal film, Shields joined on the basis that she would work with Fraser. For the meat rabbit scene, Shields asked to have a statue made of real meat hit her face instead of a fake cardboard one; "I didn't have a hamburger for a while after that," Shields explained. In order for the meat to not seep through the hands of a stunt person throwing the meat, they put a "cardboard thing" on the prop; this resulted in Shields' breaking her nose. Performing a scene where Sanders uses turkey babble to communicate with a turkey expanded Shields' depth as a method actor, describing it as "not easy."
  - Shields also appears uncredited as the wife of Tuka the Caveman in the credits.
- Matt Prokop as Tyler Sanders, the son of Dan and Tammy.
- Ken Jeong as Neal Lyman, the CEO of Lyman Enterprises who wants to develop on the lands of Rocky Springs while pretending to be eco-friendly.
- Angela Kinsey as Felder, Lyman's personal assistant.
- Toby Huss as Wilson, one of the officers.
- Skyler Samuels as Amber, the love interest of Tyler.
- Samantha Bee as Principal Baker, the principal of Tyler and Amber's school who is Tammy's boss.
- Alice Drummond as Mrs. Martin, an elderly senile school teacher and senior citizen.
- Ricky Garcia as Frank, a construction worker.
- Jim Norton as Hank, a construction worker.
- Patrice O'Neal as Gus, a construction worker. According to Norton, O'Neal was difficult to work with on Furry Vengeance: "I was like the co-dependent wife. He was just embarrassing to be associated with. We had to go in and do our first meet with the director, and we had sat around all day. And I'm trying to like, 'Hey, we're doing a movie!' And it's a Brooke Shields movie, and we're sitting down. And he's just sitting there like 'Aahhhhhh.' Everybody hated him on that shoot."
- Eugene Cordero as Cheese
- Gerry Bednob as Mr. Gupta, the sponsor of Lyman's project in Rocky Springs.
- Billy Bush as a Drill Sergeant that leads the capture of the forest animals.
- Alexander Chance as a security guard.
- Rob Riggle as Riggs (uncredited), a worker for Neal Lyman who quits following the raccoon's first attack.
- Wallace Shawn as Dr. Christian Burr (uncredited), a therapist that Tammy hooks Dan up with after various incidents with the raccoon.

The vocal effects of the raccoon and the other forest animals were performed by Dee Bradley Baker, an experience he described as "a lot of fun."

== Production ==
=== Development ===
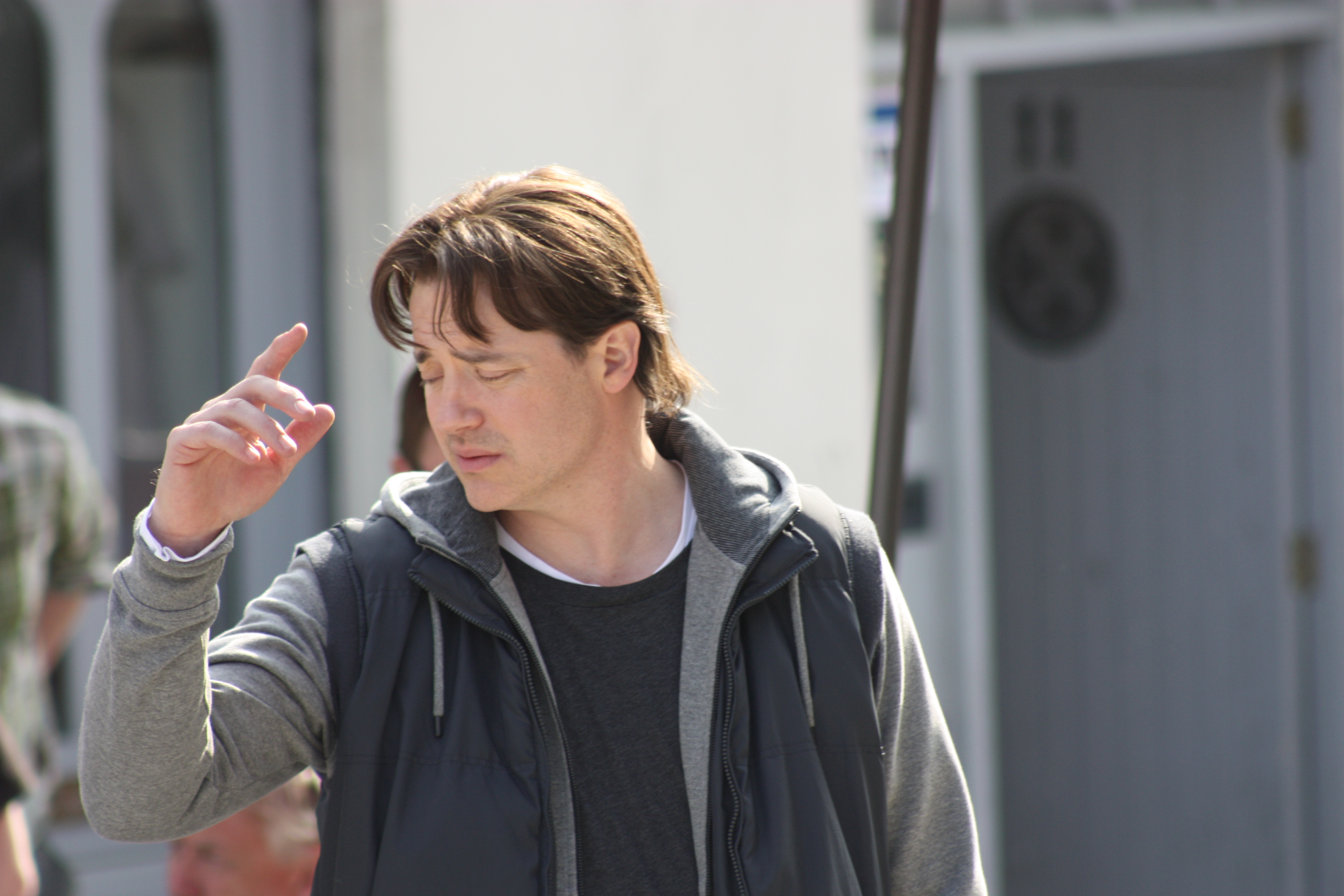
In addition to playing Dan Sanders, Fraser served as Furry Vengeance's executive producer.

On June 8, 2004, New Line Cinema bought a spec script by Carnes and Gilbert, Furry Vengeance, at a price of $750,000. Its premise of forest animals attacking a real estate developer was announced by the company; Kent Alterman, Keith Goldberg and Michelle Weiss were also announced as supervisors. Steve Carell, an actor Alterman previously worked with on The Daily Show, went on board to play the real estate developer on July 12. It would've been Carell's first studio film where he received top billing. In November 2005, Jeremy Piven was announced to replace Carell. A May 6, 2007 Variety article announced Samuel L. Jackson in the role.

On January 26, 2009, Brendan Fraser was announced to play the lead character and Roger Kumble to direct. Summit Entertainment and Participant Media were also revealed to co-finance and co-produce the film that same day, and Furry Vengeance would've be the two companies' first collaboration. It was also the first project Imagenation invested in as part of a $250 million production agreement with Participant signed in September 2008, where they would fund fifteen to eighteen of Participant's films over the course of five years.

One of Kumble's major ideas included the creatures not speaking.

Matt Prokop was cast on June 10, 2009, with Skyler Samuels joining four days later. On July 8, Brooke Shields, Ken Jeong and Samantha Bee joined; the film was Shields' first role in a mainstream film since Black and White (1999). Dick Van Dyke was also announced to appear in the film that same day, although he doesn't make an appearance in the final cut.

Furry Vengeance was initially planned to be released in July 2010, but it was changed to an April date.

=== Filming ===
Filming began on July 6, 2009.

== Music ==
Songs appearing in the film include:

- "Gavotte" – Jeff Cardoni and Katisse Buckingham
- "Frank & Beans" – Chad Fischer (version by Count Smokula)
- "Insane in the Brain" – Transcenders (original version by Cypress Hill)
- "We Got It All" – Right The Stars
- "A-Punk" – Vampire Weekend
- "Surrender" – Ben Lee
- "Don't Bring Me Down" – Electric Light Orchestra
- "Le Freak" – Chic
- "The Saddest Song" – Transcenders (version by Morphine)
- "Beautiful Morning" – Transcenders
- "Washington Post March" – John Philip Sousa
- "Cotton-Eyed Joe" – The Goodtime Stringband (version by Asleep at the Wheel)

Original music for Furry Vengeance was composed by Edward Shearmur.

== Marketing ==
When Furry Vengeance was announced in early 2009, Film School Rejects had little hope, especially when it came to Kumble being director: "The premise has some comic potential, but barring an unforeseen injection of intelligent satire into the screenplay one should expect little more than a live action takeoff on Over the Hedge, with lots of CGI and mild slapstick." Collider reported that "casting directors just keep giving Brendan Fraser more chances to bore audiences," also sarcastically suggesting Furry Vengeance "is sure to be a hilariously unpredictable comedy gem."

The trailer for Furry Vengeance was released on December 23, 2009. Using only the trailer as reference, a Cinema Blend writer suggested the film was a rip-off of Over the Hedge (2006): "Never have I seen anything so blatant. It's not only the premise that's been stolen, the trailer contains specific scenes taken right from DreamWorks movie. And that's just the trailer." Harry Knowles of Ain't It Cool News called the trailer "offensively bad," criticizing Fraser's presence and the "endless variety of shit, piss and fart gags." James White also had little hope in the film, thinking it would be nothing more than a "slapstick-laden wannabe laugh riot." However, he did look forward to seeing Riggle, Bee, and Jeong in the film. As /Film covered the trailer, "it's got self-aware animals and airbag and 'sprinkler to the crotch' jokes. If you're six, have at it. Otherwise, the less said, the better."

On January 13, 2010, the MPAA rated Furry Vengeance PG for "some rude humor, mild language and brief smoking."

Participant also collaborated with DonorsChoose to fund classroom projects about protecting wildlife and the planet. TakePart, another participating non-profit, offered a Furry Vengeance Activity Guide that included activities such as quizzes and games to help kids learn about environmental protection. Seattle Weekly noted the film's overly-simple message to extend to its marketing, joking that "They all but print the lesson plan on biodegradable popcorn boxes."

== Reception ==
=== Critical response ===
On the review aggregator website Rotten Tomatoes, 8% of 96 critics' reviews are positive, with an average rating of 2.8/10/10. The website's consensus reads: "A thin premise strethced far beyond serviceable length, Furry Vengeance subjects Brendan Fraser -- and the audience -- to 92 minutes of abuse." Metacritic, which uses a weighted average, assigned the film a score of 23 out of 100, based on 21 critics, indicating "generally unfavorable" reviews. Audiences polled by CinemaScore assigned the film an average grade of "B+" on an A+ to F scale.

Glenn Whipp of Los Angeles Times negatively summarized Furry Vengeance as "Over the Hedge through the lens of Daddy Day Care", also writing Kumble "somehow makes everything—the repeated (five times!) skunk blasts, the crotch-gnawing raccoons, the bear overturning the portable toilet with Fraser trapped inside—even less funny than you'd imagine." Fellow Los Angeles Times critic Suzanne Perez called it a contender for the worst film of 2010: "The plot offers the promise of good vibes and green energy as fuzzy creatures fight heartless developers. But the jokes are so feeble and the slapstick so silly that the mind goes numb. [...] The sorry humans are led by a hapless Brendan Fraser. His lame performance is a total embarrassment. Brooke Shields is less awful as his unhappy wife." The New York Times labeled it an "assault on common sense: "The jokes wouldn't pass muster on the Disney Channel, the story consists of an escalating series of critter attacks, and the previously mentioned special effects are surprisingly cheap-looking. When Sanders isn't fighting off funny animals, he's jousting with funny ethnics: the obsequious Hispanic foreman, the overbearing Asian boss, the greedy Indian investor." Jeong will "occasionally speak in high-pitched Japanese, thus rendering Furry Vengeance both eco-friendly and vaguely racist," wrote Robert Wilonsky. Mark Jenkins of NPR explained, "Furry Vengeance is poorly written, clumsily directed and sluggishly paced, but its essential problem is that it budgets 90 minutes on a gag that works better in 30-second spots." He also addressed, "For fans of anthropomorphized animals, the cartoonish combat has its moments. But the CGI technique wears thin, and doesn't always work. Some of the action is too contrived to be charming, and the critter crowd scenes look like the work of someone who's had about 30 minutes of Photoshop training." As Time Out New York covered the film, "We were really hoping that such an ecologically friendly, anti-big business movie wouldn't feel so plastic. But [...] Brendan Fraser brings his standard big-lug shtick to a new low. [...] he sustains bee stings, skunk sprays and groin blasts from badly computer-animated woodland creatures while enraging his nasty, racial stereotype of a boss."

Alicia Potter of The Phoenix bashed Furry Vengeance as "violent, coarse, and mirthless." Among criticisms of the "wincing" performances, such as Jeong's "racist role of Asian corporate baddie," she also wrote, "The casting of live animals that communicate via thought balloons and CGI-enhanced facial expressions charms at first, but since there's no imagination behind the boulder rolling and the poop bombs, the critters grow wearisome." In the opinion of Kurt Loder of MTV News, "Brendan Fraser runs through an alarmingly extensive repertoire of low-comic muggery—face-scrunches, eye-rolls and general dingbat gibbering." He also wrote, "In the end, of course, Dan finally gets it—the righteousness of the animals' cause and the error of his ways. We get it, too, naturally. In fact we already got it 10 minutes into the movie." AllMovie's Perry Seibert panned Furry Vengeance for its potty humor, the "vindictive jerks" portrayal of the animals, Kumble's inability to "let a gag build," and Dan Sanders being not hate-able enough to deserve his torture. The Star-Ledger writer Martin Tsai also panned the presentation of its animal characters: "the young children who are the film's target audience could easily get the impression from these creatures that wild animals don't need our protection. And the thought balloons here are just not nearly as amusing as subtitles when it comes to conveying animal communications." He also wrote, "Latent xenophobia is evident in the head developer being an Asian man who busts Bruce Lee moves and the investor being an Indian national. This racially tinged inversion of power dynamics is absurd." He called the closing credits scene the "only inspired element" of the film. Jake Coyle called the film's use of real-life animals "a tad hypocritical" for the environmental message of it as well as other Participant films like The Cove (2009). According to Screen Daily, the film's main problem was that it "dependably panders across the board to the lowest common denominator, both in action and dialogue;" Kumble's directing "abandoned any attempts at nuance, instead embracing flatly shot set piece histrionics. Here he awkwardly blends CGI critter effects with animatronics and live-action work." The film was also criticized for its use of some stereotypes, especially against Asian people and against elderly people.

Illinois Times Chuck Koplinski described the problem of the film's humor: "how much you enjoy this film is dependent on how funny you think someone being thrashed around in a Porta-Potty is." However, those ten and over "will smile occasionally at this silly production and might be a bit impressed with the computer effects on display." Allan Hunter of the Daily Express summarized the film as "a feeble family comedy that really tests your patience," reasoning that "Rarely in the field of slapstick can one actor have fallen on his backside so many times during a single film." Sheri Linden of The Hollywood Reporter summarized the film in two ways: as a "collection of feeble jokes in the service of green themes" where the writing "substitute[s] crude gags for humor at nearly every turn," and as "a jumble of Apple product placement and wan message-mongering, with a few anemic visual references to Harold Lloyd, North by Northwest and Braveheart." Philip French of The Observer summarized the film as a 1950s ecological horror film masquerading as a comedy about protecting the environment: "The hapless hero (Brendan Fraser) is treated with a degree of gleeful sadism not seen in a Hollywood comedy since Home Alone, and his contemptuous wife is played by Brooke Shields, once a chilly child star in Pretty Baby, now a hatchet-faced matron. His Chinese-American employer brings in Mr Gupta, a rich Indian entrepreneur to help destroy the American environment, a scene that should play well in downtown Bhopal." Peter Bradshaw also criticized Shields' performance, describing her as "not a natural comic performer, to say the least. Her face has the comic mobility and expressiveness of an Easter Island statue." The A.V. Club writer Scott Tobias appreciated its cast and "surprisingly tough message about so-called "eco-friendly" companies and the green PR schemes they devise to paper over their destruction of the environment." However, he was turned off by the premise of "Brendan Fraser getting beat up by creepily anthropomorphized animals." An Entertainment Weekly critic praised the choice of non-speaking animals as Kumble's "rare show of restraint" as well as the presence of comics like Bee and Kinsey; however, he found the cartoony comedy direction "creepy in live action:" "I'm not convinced that repeated assaults to the groin, bee stings to the eyes, raccoon pee in the mouth, or skunk stink sprayed head to toe is the way to teach ecological balance."

However, Furry Vengeance did receive a decent review from Empire: "Fraser's gift for goofball comedy gets a full workout, Brooke Shields proves game for a laugh, and there's a decent subtext about corporate eco-hypocrisy. The CG-enhanced animals don't talk, and the comedy is as broad as a barn—no face goes unsprayed by skunks, no crotch unsplashed by sprinklers—but kids, not to mention grown-up fans of knockabout comedy, will howl like hyenas."

=== Box office ===
The film debuted at #5 at the box office, with an estimated $6.5 million during its opening weekend; although Summit distribution president Richie Fay reported a positive audience response, he also stated the opening weekend was below their expectations. The film went down to sixth place in the next weekend, where its gross amount was 40% less than the opening. At the end of its run, it came up with $32 million worldwide. Domestically grossing $17,630,465, it was the ninth-biggest 2,000-plus-theater box office bomb of 2010.

However, it has earned at least $3 million with DVD sales, debuting at number four on Home Media Magazine's rental chart. The film was released in the United Kingdom on May 7, 2010, and opened on #2, behind Iron Man 2.

=== Accolades ===
At the Houston Film Critics Society Awards 2010, Furry Vengeance received a nomination for Worst Picture.
