= Monsters of Man =

2020 film by Mark Toia

- Poster
- Directed by: Mark Toia
- Written by: Mark Toia; Jeff Hand
- Produced by: Pam Collis; Ton That Diep; Keri Grant; Kulikar Sotho; Carolyn Toia; Mark Toia
- Starring: Neal McDonough; Brett Tutor; Jose Rosete; David Haverty; Paul Haapaniemi
- Cinematography: Mark Toia
- Edited by: Kram Aiot
- Production companies: 11:11 Entertainment; MRT Films Pty Ltd; Hanuman Films
- Distributed by: High Octane Pictures
- Release date: November 19, 2020
- Running time: 131 minutes
- Countries: Australia; Cambodia
- Language: English
- Budget: ~$1 million
- Box office: $6,854

Monsters of Man is an Australian science fiction indie film written and directed by Australian cinematographer and director Mark Toia about an amoral robotics team field testing their military robot in the Golden triangle hunting drug traffickers, with a CIA major evaluating their effectiveness.

== Plot ==
A robotics company is given the opportunity by a rogue CIA Major (Neal McDonough) to bid on a lucrative military contract.

The company illegally airdroppeds four prototype robots into the middle of the Golden triangle in Cambodia to perform a live field test on unsuspecting drug traffickers. A group of young way-lost volunteer doctors witnessed the robots killing an entire village and on command by the Robotics CEO, were hunted by the robots to cover up the sales pitch mission. The CIA were unaware that Mason (Brett Tutor), a former Navy SEAL, was living in the village, and sought to defend the surviving villagers against the robots.

From a nearby village the team of robotics engineers, Kroger, Fielding and Jantz, were remotely witnessing the outright slaughter of villagers. They were not told indiscriminate killing was a part of the test. The engineers were thinking to pull out, but went through with the field test after their CIA-handler Boller (Jose Rosete) threatening their lives and the lives of their families.

The robot BR4 (Conrad Pratt) had a bad landing coming down, and while showing signs of self-awareness and ability to overtake its fellow robots on contact, it resisted the robotics teams's attempts at shutdown and self-destruct. As the team boss and CIA-colonels jointly decided to preserve BR4's changing core setting, Boller left for the rainforest to fix things. The robotics team set the other robots hunting the rogue robot, as it was attempting to connect to the internet to make a digital backup of itself and escape the jungle.

Surviving doctors and villagers led by Mason attempted to both evade and eliminate the robots, not knowing Boller was sent after BR4 to try and mark it for a drone strike, which would kill any surviving witnesses. Ultimately, BR4 learned the importance of life and activated its self-destruction to protect the surviving humans, blasting Boller and the last operational robot.

== Cast ==
- Neal McDonough as Major
- Brett Tutor as Mason
- Jose Rosete as Boller
- David Haverty as Kroger
- Paul Haapaniemi as Jordan
- Ryan Hough as Jantz
- Ly Ty as Leap
- Ma Rynet as Keala
- Kayli Tran as Tien
- Jessica Blackmore as Fielding
- Jordy Tulleners as Dez
- Tatjana Marjanovic as Wendy
- Conrad K. Pratt as Bao and BR4
- David Samartin as Foster
- Trong Kam as Prak

== Production ==
A project of its creator Mark Toia, the film was partially funded by an Indiegogo campaign, however, Toia would self finance the bulk of the movie (A$1.6 million) from money he made in property investment. This would be Toia's first and only movie, who had been a director for commercials in his native Australia. Toia, then 56, stated that the idea for the movie came to him while he was recording a Nescafe commercial in Vietnam and had floated the script for a year in the United States before deciding to make the film himself. Toia also stated that Monsters of Man was a proof of concept that commercial directors can direct feature films, with Toia going out his way to hire commercial veterans for the crew.

Most of the motion capture work for the robots Toia helped develop and as such despite the small budget and indie size, the computer effects were professional quality. Toia stated that if he wasn't so proficient in CGI, it was likely the film would have cost $2 or $3 million more.

BR4, the sentient robot, was designed to be similar to Chappie in a "not cute sort of way", at one point dissecting a human to better understand the meaning of life. Monsters of Man would be filmed in Cambodia, and cast locals for the villagers. The bulk of the film was shot in Tahan village in Siem Reap province. There is a mid credits scene that shows BR4 had successfully uploaded itself to the internet and points towards a sequel, however, Toia would die in 2023 following a short-illness.

Toia stated that he didn't care if the film made back its budget: "I decided that if I was going to do a movie, I'd just do my own just for more of a therapy, relaxation type thing. And it was therapeutic. Because we funded it ourselves, I didn't have to listen to anyone." Toia also had praise for Ma Rynet, stating that “She is fantastic and I wouldn’t hesitate to put her in another movie if I was to ever shoot one in Cambodia again.”

== Release ==
Monsters of Man would have a short and limited theatrical release before it was made available to stream and on DVD by High Octane Films on December 8, 2020.

== Reception ==
The quality of the CGI used for the robots was praised as being "better than a lot of blockbusters", but with critics saying the movie was longer than it needed to be, and few of the doctors were particularly memorable.

Simon Foster, director of the Sydney Science Fiction Film Festival described the film as "Robocop meets Predator" Foster would select the film to open that years Festival.

Neal McDonough was praised for his role as a villain, adding "star power" to a cast of mostly unknowns. Conrad K. Pratt would be praised for his role as Bao, one of the doctors, and as the man in mocap playing the four robots.

Monsters of Man would top the iTunes charts after its release. Due to the COVID-19 pandemic the film was not shown in any other festivals.
