= Hot in Cleveland season 5 =

Hot in Cleveland
- Season 5
- No. of episodes: 24

Release
- Original network: TV Land
- Original release: March 26 – September 10, 2014

Season chronology
- ← Previous; Season 4 Next → Season 6

The fifth season of the TV Land original sitcom Hot in Cleveland premiered on March 26, 2014 with the series' second live episode. It consisted of 24 episodes, including the series' 100th episode. The series stars Valerie Bertinelli, Wendie Malick, Jane Leeves, and Betty White.

== Cast ==
=== Main ===
- Valerie Bertinelli as Melanie Moretti
- Jane Leeves as Rejoyla "Joy" Scroggs
- Wendie Malick as Victoria Chase
- Betty White as Elka Ostrovsky

=== Recurring ===
- Georgia Engel as Mamie Sue Johnson
- Dave Foley as Bob
- Craig Ferguson as Simon
- John Mahoney as Roy / Rusty Banks
- Bill Bellamy as Councilman Powell
- Tim Daly as Mitch
- Dan Lauria as J.J.

=== Special guest stars ===
- Alex Trebek as Narrator
- Cedric the Entertainer as Reverend Boyce
- Ken Jeong as Dr. Kang
- Thomas Lennon as Agent Gilmore
- Jaime Pressly as Kelly
- Susan Lucci as herself
- Jennifer Love Hewitt as Emmy Chase
- Cheri Oteri as Dr. Deb
- Kirstie Alley as Maddie Banks
- Chevy Chase as Ross
- Rob Schneider as Chill
- Juliet Mills as Philipa Scroggs
- Morgan Fairchild as Claudia / Elka
- Chris Colfer as Tony Chase
- Steven Tyler as Steven Tyler (voice)
- Queen Latifah as Aunt Esther Jean Johnson
- Perez Hilton as Teddy
- Debra Monk as Loretta Moretti
- Carl Reiner as Max
- Marion Ross as Olga
- Chris Harrison as himself
- Stephen Root as Brian

=== Guest stars ===
- Constance Zimmer as Lily
- D.W. Moffett as Chester
- Albert Tsai as Scout
- Jay Harrington as Alec
- Michael McMillian as Owen
- Angela Kinsey as Mrs. Carson
- Matt Iseman as Mike
- Laird Macintosh as Ram
- Larry Miller as Larry
- Chris Elliott as Luke
- Jason Priestley as Corey Chambers
- Richard Ruccolo as Matt
- Sarah Hyland as Ivy
- Max Greenfield as Doug
- Chris Isaak as Chase Jackson
- Tommy Dewey as Todd
- Kelly Schumann as Sally
- Eric Allan Kramer as Milo
- Mark Valley as Jason
- Edward Hibbert as Collin Brett
- Jamie Denbo as Julie
- John Ross Bowie as Benny
- J.P. Manoux as Nate
- Maggie Wheeler as Rachel
- Harry Van Gorkum as Daniel
- Nora Dunn as Elizabeth / Victoria
- Steve Valentine as Jay / Joy
- Emily Rutherfurd as Jodie / Melanie
- Coby Bell as Baz
- Dan Castellaneta as Dr. McNally
- Sam Daly as Justin
- Lance Barber as Tyler
- David Kaye as Narrator (voice)
- Dee Bradley Baker as George Clooney the Dog (voice)
- Jim Meskimen as Robert Redford & Quasimodo (voice)
- Cedric Yarbrough as LeBron (voice)
- Craig Bierko as Donald
- Will Sasso as Frankie
- Anita Barone as Lisa
- Andrew Leeds as Tom
- Nicole Parker as Jessica
- Andrew Friedman as Dr. Rayner
- Mac Brandt as Mac
- Romy Rosemont as Marcie
- Luke Perry as Trevor

== Production ==
On March 20, 2013, TV Land renewed Hot In Cleveland for a fifth season. Production of the fifth season began on September 16, 2013, and premiered on March 26, 2014 with their second special live episode. Season five also featured the 100th episode, titled "Win Win" which filmed on May 2, 2014, and a cross-over episode with fellow TV Land series Kirstie where the girls visit New York City and run into Kirstie Alley's character Maddie Banks, who is Victoria's former roommate. This season also had a special animated episode, titled "The Animated Episode", that featured homages to Willy Wonka & The Chocolate Factory, The Walking Dead, and Frankenstein.

Guest stars for this season include: Jason Priestley as Corey Chambers, a movie star that Melanie had a crush on in high school, Thomas Lennon as a by-the-book FBI agent, who investigates the disappearance of Victoria's husband and has a profound effect on the ladies, Chris Elliott as Luke, Elka's new laid-back boyfriend, Sarah Hyland as Ivy, an actress who threatens Victoria's chances of an Oscar nomination, Tim Daly as Mitch Turner, the new owner of the detective agency where Joy works, Chevy Chase as Ross Barkley, a man with a deep dark secret who goes on a date with Melanie, Max Greenfield as a con man who poses as a pet adoption consultant, Nora Dunn, Emily Rutherfurd and Morgan Fairchild as actresses cast in Elka's new play about herself, Angela Kinsey as the Headmistress of a pre-school that Joy wants to get her grandson into, and Chris Isaak as Melanie's favorite singer. Bill Bellamy has a recurring role this season as Councilman Powell, Elka's opponent for a Cleveland City Council seat. Previously recurring guest stars returning for season five include: Jennifer Love Hewitt, Susan Lucci, Craig Ferguson, John Mahoney, Michael McMillian, Jay Harrington, Dave Foley, Georgia Engel, Juliet Mills and Carl Reiner.

== Release ==
Season five was released in Region 1 on November 4, 2014. The DVD includes all 24 episodes on 3 discs.

== Episodes ==
No. overall	No. in season	Title	Directed by	Written by	Original release date	Prod. code	U.S. viewers (millions)
81	1	"Stayin' Alive"	Andy Cadiff	Laura Solon	March 26, 2014	519	1.35
In a live episode, as Victoria wonders aloud where Emmett may have fled, Elka mentions a remote cabin that her mobster ex-husband used as a hideout. The girls all go there, but find it occupied by Chester (D. W. Moffett, Victoria's former "man-boobs" date) and his now-wife/accomplice Lily (Constance Zimmer), who have robbed a bank and are hiding out. Detective Bob (Dave Foley) joins them, after misreading an auto-corrected text from Joy. A Korean plastic surgeon (Ken Jeong) arrives to alter Chester's appearance, but he recognizes Victoria from her adult underpants commercials and obsesses over her. In the end, it is up to Alex Trebek (who introduced the live episode, but is now working his weekend park ranger job) to rescue the clan.
82	2	"Surprise!"	Shelley Jensen	Sam Johnson & Chris Marcil	April 2, 2014	501	N/A
An FBI agent (Thomas Lennon) hooks up all four ladies to a polygraph to see if any are lying about not knowing where Emmett is. The agent frustrates Victoria by saying he cannot reveal details of his investigation, not even if Emmett is alive or dead, but she does later get a note from Emmett. Melanie tells Alec that she's pregnant, only to find that he has moved on to another girlfriend (Jaime Pressly). Melanie later learns that her pregnancy test was a false positive, caused by a tumor on her pituitary gland. Joy starts to get hit on by numerous men, which Elka attributes to Joy no longer giving off a "stench of desperation" now that Simon is back in her life. Meanwhile, Elka is just happy that the polygraph proved she has been telling the girls the truth about once sleeping with Frank Sinatra.
83	3	"Dr. Who?"	Shelley Jensen	Aaron Shure	April 9, 2014	502	1.21
Owen's first meeting with his father, Simon, coincides with an interview to get Wilbur into an exclusive preschool. So Simon, Joy and Owen must act like a perfect, close-knit family in front of the headmistress (Angela Kinsey). Elsewhere, Victoria has been entering Wilbur in pageants and Melanie has a hard time choosing a doctor to treat her tumor.
84	4	"The Undead"	John Whitesell	Rachel Sweet	April 16, 2014	503	1.10
Victoria receives a mysterious box containing a pair of hiking boots (which she would never wear), and is then visited by an FBI agent who tells her that Emmett has died in a plane crash over an Asian mountain range. Victoria then finds a note from Emmett in a boot stating that he faked his death, and he wants her to join him. She then sets the girls in motion to announce her own fake death to the press and set up a memorial service. Victoria attends her own service wearing a veil, and is not gone long before she returns to the girls, stating she cannot uproot her current life to be with Emmett. Meanwhile, Simon announces to Joy that he's quitting the paparazzi business and has been offered a job working on a documentary in sub-Saharan Africa.
85	5	"Elka Takes a Lover"	John Whitesell	Laura Solon	April 23, 2014	504	1.02
Emmy arrives for the premiere of Victoria's movie, and announces she's 8 months pregnant and had earlier eloped with her schoolteacher boyfriend. Melanie and Joy both attend the premiere with unintended dates -- Melanie with her creepy dentist (Larry Miller) and Joy with Detective Bob after he pretended to be a fake cousin named Stone Van Buren. Meanwhile, Elka has a much younger lover, a free spirit named Luke (Chris Elliott).
86	6	"Rusty Banks Rides Again"	Andy Cadiff	Sebastian Jones	April 30, 2014	505	N/A
Desperate for votes to be nominated for an Oscar, Victoria sets the girls on a task to sway the two known Academy members living in Cleveland. Elka is assigned to the actor who played Western star Rusty Banks as a child (which turns out to be her ex-boyfriend Roy), while Melanie must talk to her childhood crush, actor Corey Chambers (Jason Priestley). Meanwhile, Joy is tasked with trying to convince the young Ivy (Sarah Hyland), a critics' favorite for an Oscar who is in therapy trying to deal with her sudden fame, to drop out of the race. While Victoria fails to get any favors done, things work out well for the other girls. Elka and Roy start dating again, Joy makes a date with Ivy's therapist, while Corey agrees to accompany Melanie to her upcoming high school reunion.
87	7	"The One with George Clooney"	Andy Cadiff	Suzanne Martin	May 7, 2014	506	N/A
The girls all want to adopt an adorable dog, but learn that an animal shelter representative (Max Greenfield) must first visit with them to determine if they are qualified to own a pet. The man cons Melanie, Joy and Victoria into sleeping with him before they realize he is just a volunteer at the shelter who uses their database to prey on older women. The girls eventually get to keep the dog, and name him George Clooney. Meanwhile, Elka finds Mamie Sue at Roy's house, and Roy admits he was dating Mamie Sue before he reconnected with Elka and couldn't bear to tell either one of them. They briefly consider a threesome before both Elka and Mamie Sue find a reason to end things with Roy.
88	8	"Brokeback Elka"	Andy Cadiff	Laura Solon	May 14, 2014	507	N/A
Melanie and the girls start taking advantage of the sympathy surrounding her brain tumor, but then have to decide whether to continue milking the condition after Melanie gets news from her doctor that she is cancer-free. For example, Melanie gets backstage passes to see her favorite singer, Chase Jackson (Chris Isaak), who is sympathetic to her condition, but is conflicted when the singer shows up at the house and writes a song for her. Joy dates a radio morning show personality, but soon regrets it after he insults her on the air for laughs. Also, Victoria falls for an online boyfriend, but it turns out to be Elka impersonating a rugged rancher from Wyoming.
89	9	"Bad George Clooney"	Andy Cadiff	Sebastian Jones	June 4, 2014	509	0.87
A radio pet psychologist (Cheri Oteri) tries to help the ladies figure out why George Clooney is causing trouble with the neighbors. She suggests the ladies' own stresses -- Victoria losing Emmett, Melanie's health scare, and the constant bickering between Joy and Elka -- are being transferred to the dog. She recommends that Victoria date a so-called "regular guy", convinces Melanie to follow her passion now that she is healthy again, and has Joy and Elka agree to quit hurling insults at each other.
90	10	"Bucket: We're Going to New York"	Andy Cadiff	Rachel Sweet	June 11, 2014	508	0.78
Victoria tries to gain some "Oscar karma" by going to New York and finally apologizing to her old acting school roommate, Maddie Banks (Kirstie Alley, playing her character from the sitcom Kirstie). It seems Maddie had received an audition call for the film Sophie's Choice back in the day, but Victoria, angry with Maddie for sleeping with her boyfriend, never gave her the message. The girls all tag along, as Elka wants to meet some Madison Avenue-types who might be interested in her silver polish, Joy wants to fulfill a lifelong dream of auditioning for The Rockettes, and Melanie sees an opportunity to cross some "bad girl" items off her bucket list. Mark Valley guest stars as Jason, a man that Melanie has sex with in an elevator before she realizes he is the boyfriend that had dumped Maddie only a day earlier. Things get worse when Elka ruins Maddie's tony, Joy shoe fell off and hits Maddie.
91	11	"Undercover Lovers"	Andy Cadiff	Jessica Wood & Jameson Lyons	June 18, 2014	511	N/A
Joy and Detective Bob are tailing a couple as part of an undercover assignment, which has them sharing a hotel room. Melanie's radio station decides a publicity stunt is needed to make her new "Ask Melanie" call-in show more widely known, so she has to do the show for 24 straight hours. Victoria's strategists have told her that supporting a cause will boost her chances for an Oscar nomination. She decides to run for a city council seat in order to save dog parks that will otherwise be closed, but she recants her candidacy when she sees her opponent, Councilman Powell (Bill Bellamy), is African American and uses a wheelchair. Elka, determined to save the dog parks, runs against Powell instead. After spending time with Bob, Joy decides he really is a good guy and puts the moves on him, but Bob reveals he has to leave to be with his new girlfriend in Canada.
92	12	"I Just Met the Man I'm Going to Marry"	Andy Cadiff	Aaron Shure	June 25, 2014	512	1.02
Joy meets her new employer Mitch (Tim Daly) and thinks he is perfect for her, but she is quickly disappointed when he falls for Melanie. Victoria, still hoping for her elusive Oscar nomination, is invited to Los Angeles to present the nominations on live TV. The girls all head to L.A., and Victoria is seated on the plane next to a Price Waterhouse rep who may have the nominations in a locked briefcase. She fails to sneak a peak inside the briefcase, but is later thrilled when she announces her own name at the nomination ceremony. Meanwhile, Elka has an uphill climb in her city council race, but gets a boost from a stunt during Victoria's presentation.
93	13	"People Feeding People"	Andy Cadiff	Alex Herschlag	July 2, 2014	513	N/A
Melanie announces that she is breaking up with Mitch after just a few dates, so Joy finally admits to her that she is interested in Mitch. Melanie says she's meeting Ross Barkley (Chevy Chase), the head of the "People Feeding People" charity, for dinner. Elka asks Melanie if she can get Ross's endorsement for her city council bid, while Victoria is hoping Ross will allow her to be a spokesperson for the charity in order to keep her face on TV for the Oscar voters. Joy uses the opportunity to try and convince Mitch that Melanie is moving on. But Melanie becomes creeped out by Ross soon after he reveals gruesome details about a past incident.
94	14	"Murder House"	Andy Cadiff	Suzanne Martin	July 2, 2014	510	N/A
A big storm coincides with the 50th anniversary of a murder that occurred in the house, and Elka fears the ghost of the victim will reappear. Victoria returns home from a trip to the Caribbean with her new island pal Chill (Rob Schneider) in tow. Melanie's high school friend Rachel (Maggie Wheeler) is stuck at the house after the storm blocks the road. Joy's mother Philippa arrives following an emergency plane stop in Cleveland, along with a new, younger boyfriend named Daniel (Harry Van Gorkum). Compounding things is the fact that Joy once slept with Daniel, though he doesn't seem to remember.
95	15	"Playmates"	Andy Cadiff	Aaron Shure	July 9, 2014	514	N/A
The girls attend a play that Elka wrote about her life, and are taken aback by the characterizations of "Melanie" (Emily Rutherfurd), "Victoria" (Nora Dunn) and "Joy" (Steve Valentine). But after talking to the actors, the girls get a new perspective on themselves. Morgan Fairchild plays the part of Elka in the production.
96	16	"Auction Heroes"	Anthony Rich	Suzanne Martin	July 16, 2014	515	N/A
Victoria meets J.J. (Dan Lauria), the "Junior from Cleveland State" who wrote a script for an independent film that she fell in love with, but the guy is nothing like what she expected. Joy decides to finally tell Mitch how she feels, but Mitch's "date consultant" Baz (Coby Bell) gets in the way. When Baz falls for Joy, he sabotoges Mitch and Joy's first date. Elka holds a fundraising auction for her city council bid, auctioning off a date with each of the girls without telling them beforehand.
97	17	"Straight Outta Cleveland"	Andy Cadiff	Jessica Wood & Jameson Lyons	July 23, 2014	518	0.89
Victoria's son Tony (Chris Colfer) pays a visit accompanied by his business partner. Victoria assumes the man is her son's lover, as she's always been convinced that Tony is gay, but Tony tries to figure out a way to tell his mother that he's straight. Elsewhere, Joy and Mitch are tracking a cheating man and try to use Melanie as their "honey bait", but she's terrible at it. Joy and Mitch also see a couples counselor and consider that they may not be right for each other after they fail the counselor's compatibility test.
98	18	"The Animated Episode"	Andy Cadiff	Sam Johnson & Chris Marcil	July 30, 2014	516	0.69
The girls finally go into the caretaker's house where Elka lives, and it turns out to be entirely animated. While visiting the Rock and Roll Hall of Fame, they meet Steven Tyler, who offers them three wishes. First, the ladies wish for eternal youth and beauty; in an homage to Willy Wonka and the Chocolate Factory, they are whisked away to a Parisian factory where they tamper with Elka's rejuvenation experiments, resulting in disastrous alterations to their bodies. Second, the girls wish that all men would be "hungry" for them; in a parody of The Walking Dead, they wind up in a zombie apocalypse and use parts of the zombies they kill to construct their ideal men in the style of Frankenstein, only for them to still have realistic relationship problems. Finally, Elka wishes that LeBron James never left Cleveland; in a tribute to The Wizard of Oz, Cleveland turns into a seeming utopia that the ladies find too similar to Los Angeles. When they convince James, now king of Cleveland, to leave, the city descends into dystopia. Realizing they should be more thankful for what they have, the ladies ask Elka to take them back to reality, where she advises them to forget about the experience despite George Clooney still appearing as an animated talking dog.
99	19	"Strange Bedfellows"	Anthony Rich	Rachel Sweet	August 6, 2014	517	1.00
Melanie sleeps with Donald, then discovers he is the campaign manager for Elka's city council opponent, Councilman Powell. She leaks that Elka can't hold her liquor, which Powell tries to use to his advantage during a public debate, but Elka gains the upper hand. Meanwhile, Victoria and J.J. begin a relationship. Queen Latifah guest stars as Councilman Powell's aunt.
100	20	"The Italian Job"	John Whitesell	Sebastian Jones	August 13, 2014	520	0.85
Victoria meets J.J.'s children, but finds they are still hurting from their mother's passing. When Victoria dresses as J.J.'s wife for a film rehearsal and sees his reaction, she realizes that he too needs more time to heal. Elsewhere, Melanie deals with her new chauvinistic co-host (Will Sasso), while Joy and Elka scheme to get a professor to allow a make-up test after they fail his final exam.
101	21	"Mystery Date: Oscar Edition"	Andy Cadiff	Alex Herschlag	August 20, 2014	521	0.76
With the Oscar Awards just three weeks away, Victoria gets her Red Carpet invitation with a "plus one" notification. She cannot decide between Melanie and Joy, so the two friends embark on a series of favors for Victoria to prove who is her true "best" friend. As the favors have increasingly drastic effects, Melanie and Joy finally decide to call a truce and tell Victoria to take Elka. Of course, Elka has already planned for this, evidenced by her Oscar dress being delivered to the girls' door at the end of the episode. Perez Hilton guest stars as spa receptionist Teddy.
102	22	"Win Win"	Andy Cadiff	Lisa Slopey	August 27, 2014	522	0.82
Convinced that she won't react well if another nominee wins the Best Supporting Actress Oscar, Victoria decides to fake an illness and stay home in bed, but she has a camera and live feed ready just in case. Elka pulls some dirty tricks against her city council opponent on election eve, and throws Mamie under the bus in the process. Melanie wants to look more like her heavily-Photoshopped promo poster for her radio show, but her diet plans get tougher when her mom (Debra Monk) shows up. In the end, Elka wins the election for city council and Victoria wins her first Oscar.
103	23	"Don Elka"	Andy Cadiff	Sam Johnson & Chris Marcil	September 3, 2014	523	0.84
After winning her city council election, Elka gets carried away with her newfound power. As Joy becomes increasingly happy with Mitch, Simon announces that he is returning, and Joy is conflicted with who she loves more. Simon arrives and influences Joy to remember her love for him through the use of many disguises, including a priest, a masseuer, and even a Scottish nanny after Mamie Sue brings up Mrs. Doubtfire. Meanwhile, a delivery mix-up ruins the expected arrival of Victoria's Oscar statue.
104	24	"The Bachelors"	Andy Cadiff	Jameson Lyons & Lisa Slopey & Jessica Wood	September 10, 2014	524	0.91
On the annual day when the women set up dates for each other, Joy backs out because she is going out with her steady boyfriend Mitch. Later, Mitch, Simon and Detective Bob all propose marriage, and Joy must choose one of them. Meanwhile, Melanie dates a man who fell in love with her on-air personality, but now loves his sex surrogate. Victoria dates a former model (Luke Perry) who has decided to donate his ample forehead for scientific causes. Elka is set up on a date with her first love from Poland, Stan, but finds he is now a woman (Marion Ross). As Joy's three suitors fight, she is accidentally punched by Simon, landing her in the hospital before she can make a choice.
