= Matt Prokop =

American actor (born 1990)

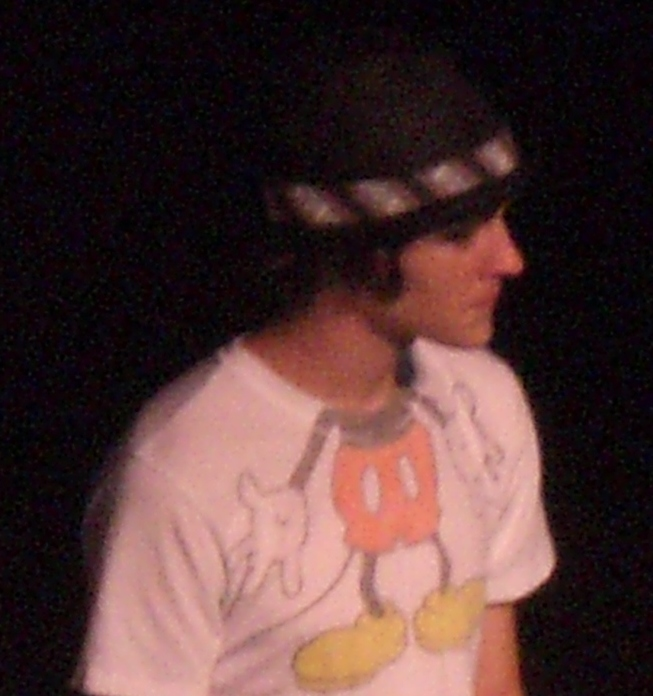
- Matt Prokop promoting High School Musical 3 in 2008
- Born: Matthew Ray Prokop; July 29, 1990 (age 36); Victoria, Texas, U.S.
- Occupation: Actor
- Years active: 2007–2015

Matthew Ray Prokop (born July 29, 1990) is an American former actor who is known for his roles as Jimmie "The Rocket Man" Zara in the Disney film High School Musical 3: Senior Year (2008) and Josh Rosen in the Disney Channel Original Movie Geek Charming (2011).

== Early life ==
Prokop was born in Victoria, Texas, and moved to Los Angeles at the age of 16 to pursue his acting career.

== Career ==
In 2011, Prokop was represented by Management 360 and APA. His first acting job was a brief appearance on Hannah Montana in 2007, followed by a walk-on role on The Office. One of his most well-known roles is Jimmie “Rocket Man” Zara in Disney Channel’s High School Musical 3: Senior Year.

He guest starred on Medium (2009) as Kyle "K.C." Covington for one episode. Prokop landed a role in Furry Vengeance (2010), as Tyler Sanders, the son of Dan Sanders (Brenden Fraser), and he played the role of Josh Rosen in the Disney Channel's Geek Charming (2011), based on author Robin Palmer's novel.

In 2012, he appeared in an episode of Modern Family, opposite then-girlfriend and series regular Sarah Hyland. His last acting credit was in the 2013 film April Apocalypse, with his last three film roles being in films starring Hyland. He was also a producer of the 2015 film See You in Valhalla, which also starred Hyland and was produced before she broke up with Prokop. However, Prokop was legally disallowed from attending the film's premiere due to Hyland's protection order against him that took effect six months before the film's release (described further below).

== Personal life and legal issues ==
Prokop dated his Geek Charming co-star Sarah Hyland for four years until August 2014, when she left him and filed a domestic violence temporary restraining order against him for physically and verbally abusing her throughout their four-year relationship. In October 2014, a permanent restraining order was granted, and Prokop has not worked in the entertainment industry since.

=== 2024 arrest ===
On May 18, 2024, Prokop was arrested for alleged aggravated assault against his girlfriend following a public incident in his hometown at Victoria, Texas, and for resisting arrest. He was released on bond shortly after.

=== 2025 arrest ===
On December 24, 2025, Prokop was arrested for violating bond conditions, and evading and resisting arrest. On December 31, an additional charge of possession or promotion of child pornography was added. Overall, he was charged with two felonies and four misdemeanor charges, including one count of a violation of bond. As of January 10, 2026, he is being held at the Victoria County Sheriff’s Office Jail in Victoria County, Texas without bail. On March 19, he was indicted on possessing alleged child pornography and violating a protective order.

== Filmography ==
=== Film ===
Year	Title	Role	Notes
2007	Marked	Zack	Short film
2007	An Angel Named Billy	Zack	
2008	Green Flash	Cameron (Young)	
2008	High School Musical 3: Senior Year	Jimmie "Rocket Man" Zara	
2010	Furry Vengeance	Tyler Sanders	
2010	Monster Heroes	Pretty Jonas Stein	
2010	I Owe My Life to Corbin Bleu	Cool Guy	Short film
2011	Conception	J.T.	
2011	Cougar Hunting	Tyler	
2011	Geek Charming	Josh Rosen	Television film
2012	Struck By Lightning	Dwayne Michaels	
2013	April Apocalypse	Tommy	Direct-to-video
2015	See You in Valhalla	—N/a	Producer

=== Television ===
Year	Title	Role	Notes
2007	Hannah Montana	Troy McCann	Episode: "Schooly Bully"
2007	The Office	Underaged Kid #3	Episode: "Cocktails"
2009	In the Motherhood	Luke	
2009	Medium	Kyle "K.C." Covington	Episode: "Once in a Lifetime"
2011	Good Luck Charlie	Evan	Episode: "L.A.R.P. in the Park"
2012	Modern Family	Ethan	Episode: "Disneyland"
2013	Perception	Ian Vetter	Episode: "Defective"

== Discography ==
Year	Title	Other artist(s)	Album
2008	"Senior Year Spring Musical"	Ashley Tisdale	High School Musical 3: Senior Year
2008	"We're All in This Together" (Graduation Mix)	High School Musical 3 cast	High School Musical 3: Senior Year
2008	"High School Musical"	High School Musical 3 cast	High School Musical 3: Senior Year
