= Sarah Hyland =

American actress and singer (born 1990)

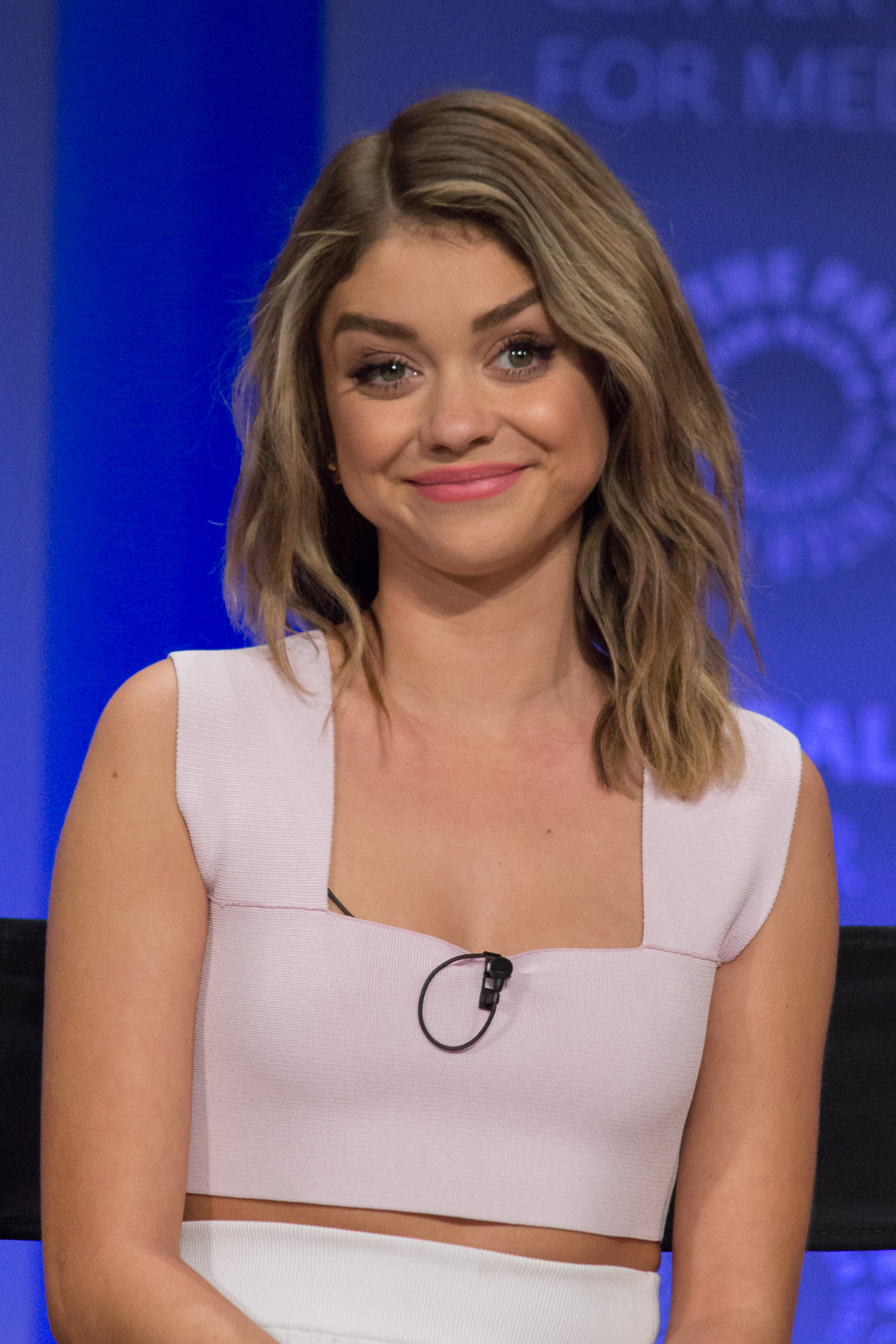
- Hyland at the 2015 PaleyFest
- Born: Sarah Jane Hyland; November 24, 1990 (age 35); New York City, U.S.
- Education: Professional Performing Arts School
- Occupations: Actress; singer
- Years active: 1997–present
- Spouse: Wells Adams (m. 2022)

Sarah Jane Hyland (born November 24, 1990) is an American actress and singer. She is best known for playing Haley Dunphy in the ABC sitcom Modern Family (2009–2020), for which she received a nomination for the Critics' Choice Television Award for Best Supporting Actress in a Comedy Series.

Born in Manhattan, she attended the Professional Performing Arts School before having minor roles in the films Private Parts (1997), Annie (1999) and Blind Date (2007).

Hyland also had roles in the films Geek Charming (2011), Struck by Lightning (2012), Scary Movie 5 (2013), Vampire Academy (2014), See You in Valhalla (2015), XOXO (2016), Dirty Dancing (2017), and The Wedding Year (2019). She has appeared on Broadway in Grey Gardens (2006–2007), The Great Gatsby (2025), and Just in Time (2025–2026). From 2022 to 2023, Hyland hosted Love Island USA on Peacock.

As a singer, in addition to Broadway theatre and off-Broadway performances, Hyland sang "Closer" and "Don't Wanna Know" (which peaked at No. 62 on the Billboard Canadian Hot 100 chart in December 2016) with Boyce Avenue. She has also collaborated with BoTalks, Jordan McGraw, Adam DeVine and others.

== Early life and education ==
Sarah Jane Hyland was born in the East Village of Lower Manhattan (in New York City, New York) on November 24, 1990. She is the daughter of actors Melissa Canaday and Edward James Hyland, and the sister of actor Ian Hyland.

Hyland attended the Professional Performing Arts School in Manhattan.

== Career ==
Hyland has been acting since her first role as Howard Stern's daughter in the film Private Parts in 1997. She went on to portray roles such as Molly in the 1999 television film of Annie and Maddie Healy in Lipstick Jungle on NBC. Hyland was featured in an Olive Garden commercial along with actress Molly Culver. She also appeared on Broadway as the young Jacqueline Bouvier in Grey Gardens (2006).

From 2009 to 2020, Hyland played Haley Dunphy on the ABC sitcom Modern Family, for which she and the rest of the show's cast won the Screen Actors Guild Award for Outstanding Performance by an Ensemble in a Comedy Series each year from 2011 through 2014.

In 2011, Hyland co-starred in the Disney Channel Original Movie Geek Charming. In 2012, Hyland appeared in the film Struck by Lightning. In September 2012, she was involved in a Nintendo 3DS ad campaign along with Dianna Agron and Gabby Douglas.

Additional musical projects and theatre productions Hyland has performed in are: Kerrigan-Lowdermilk Live (2013 concert), Hair (2014 adaptation at the Hollywood Bowl), The Unauthorized Musical Parody of Scream (2014 play at Rockwell Table & Stage) and The Kindred Foundation for Adoption created by Jenna Ushkowitz and Samantha Futerman (2015 fundraiser).

In 2014 and 2018, Hyland was a co-host at the Disney Parks Christmas Day Parade (during Disney Parks Frozen Christmas Celebration and The Wonderful World of Disney: Magical Holiday Celebration), which included dancing and singing with Jordan Fisher. Hyland also made a guest appearance during The Wonderful World of Disney: Disneyland 60 (2016) and Mickey's 90th Spectacular (2018).

In 2016, Hyland covered songs with Boyce Avenue such as "Closer" by The Chainsmokers and "Don't Wanna Know" by Maroon 5, both included on the Boyce Avenue album Cover Sessions Vol. 4, which was released on December 19, 2017. "Don't Wanna Know" peaked at No. 62 on the Billboard Canadian Hot 100 chart in December 2016.

In 2019, Hyland partnered with Olay for a skin product campaign.

Hyland sang her debut performance of "Met At a Party" with Jordan McGraw (son of Dr. Phil) at the 2019 Teen Choice Awards. The single was released on August 9, 2019, via Republic Records.

In December 2020, Hyland appeared in a Taco Bell commercial called "The Craving" with Joe Keery.

In October 2021, she became the new creative director and co-founder of Sourse, a line of chocolate-infused vitamins (including "Beauty Bites" and "Mood Bites").

In August 2022, Hyland began hosting Love Island USA on Peacock. In August 2022, she appeared on America's Got Talent (alongside Sofía Vergara) during the first live Qualifier Results Show of season seventeen to assist season sixteen winner Dustin Tavella with his magic act.

Hyland starred in Pitch Perfect: Bumper in Berlin, which premiered in November 2022 on Peacock.

From May 28 to September 29, 2024, she played Audrey in the Off-Broadway revival of Little Shop of Horrors opposite Andrew Barth Feldman as Seymour. Hyland returned to Broadway on February 10, 2025, in The Great Gatsby as Daisy opposite Ryan McCartan in the title role. From October 2025 to March 2026, she replaced Gracie Lawrence in Just in Time as Connie Francis starring opposite Jonathan Groff. She was replaced by Isa Briones.

== Personal life ==
=== Relationships ===
Hyland dated her Geek Charming co-star Matt Prokop for four years after meeting in 2010. In August 2014, Hyland obtained a domestic violence temporary restraining order against Prokop for physically and verbally abusing her throughout the four years of their relationship. In October of that same year, the restraining order became permanent.

Hyland dated her Shadowhunters and Vampire Academy co-star Dominic Sherwood from 2015 until 2017.

In 2017, Hyland began a relationship with Wells Adams, a radio and television personality and former contestant on The Bachelorette and Bachelor in Paradise. The couple became engaged in July 2019, and, in May 2020, they purchased a home in Los Angeles, a month before their planned wedding date. However, the COVID-19 pandemic caused them to postpone their wedding multiple times. An outdoor bridal shower in early June 2022 marked the end of their two-year delay, and the couple married at a California vineyard on August 20, 2022. Their wedding was attended by Hyland's Modern Family co-stars.

=== Health ===
Hyland was diagnosed with kidney dysplasia as a child and received a kidney transplant from her father in April 2012. That kidney failed after a few years, leading to a second kidney transplant in September 2017, donated by her younger brother, Ian. Hyland is on regular anti-rejection medicines and steroids to ensure that her body does not reject her donated kidney; consequently, Hyland has difficulty maintaining weight and muscle mass, and has been put on bed-rest several times, sometimes continuing to film Modern Family simultaneously. Hyland has said that she does not recall shooting some episodes of Modern Family because she was so tired that she slept most of the time she was not shooting her scenes.

In a December 2018 Self magazine article, Hyland said she had contemplated suicide because she felt she was a burden on her family and blamed herself for her body rejecting her father's kidney. Since birth, she has undergone 16 surgeries to improve her health, including numerous kidney surgeries and a laparoscopic surgery to treat her endometriosis.

== Filmography ==
=== Film ===
Year	Title	Role	Notes	Ref.
1997	A Tall Winter's Tale	Elizabeth		
1997	Private Parts	Howard's daughter		
1998	The Object of My Affection	Molly		
1998	Advice from a Caterpillar	Lizbeth		
1999	Cradle Will Rock	Silvano – Giovanna		
2000	Joe Gould's Secret	Elizabeth Mitchell		
2002	The Empath	Young Christine		
2004	Spanglish	Sleepover friend		
2007	Blind Date	Child	Voice	
2010	Monster Heroes	Delilah		
2010	Cougars, Inc.	Courtney		
2011	Conception	Tracey		
2012	Struck by Lightning	Claire Mathews		
2013	Scary Movie 5	Mia		
2013	April Apocalypse	Samm		
2014	Vampire Academy	Natalie Dashkov		
2014	Date and Switch	Ava		
2015	See You in Valhalla	Johana Burwood	Also producer	
2016	Satanic	Chloe		
2016	Lego DC Comics Super Heroes: Justice League – Gotham City Breakout	Batgirl	Voice	
2016	XOXO	Krystal	Also executive producer	
2019	The Wedding Year	Mara Baylor	Also executive producer	
2022	My Fake Boyfriend	Kelly		
TBA	The Token Groomsman †	Mia	Filming	

=== Television ===
Year	Title	Role	Notes	Ref.
1997–1998	Another World	Rain Wolfe		
1998	Trinity	Shy girl	Episode: "No Secrets"	
1999	Annie	Molly	Television film	
2000	The Audrey Hepburn Story	Young Audrey Hepburn	Television film	
2000	All My Children	Karen	2 episodes	
2000	Falcone	Jess Pistone Egan	Unknown episodes	
2001, 2009	Law & Order: Special Victims Unit	Lily Ramsey	Episode: "Repression"	
2001, 2009	Law & Order: Special Victims Unit	Jennifer Banks	Episode: "Hothouse"	
2002	Touched by an Angel	Grace	Episode: "A Feather on the Breath of God"	
2004	Law & Order	Kristine McLean	Episode: "The Dead Wives Club"	
2005	Law & Order: Trial by Jury	Brianne Colby	Episode: "Vigilante"	
2007	One Life to Live	Heather	7 episodes	
2008–2009	Lipstick Jungle	Maddie Healy	15 episodes	
2009–2020	Modern Family	Haley Dunphy	Main role; 218 episodes	
2010	Cubed	Herself	Episode 2.4	
2011	Childrens Hospital	Famous person	Episode: "Nip/Tug"	
2011	Geek Charming	Dylan Schoenfield	Television film	
2012	Punk'd	Herself	Episode: "Lucy Hale"	
2012	Perception	Girl with Tourette syndrome	Episode: "Kilimanjaro"	
2012–2015	Randy Cunningham: 9th Grade Ninja	Theresa Fowler	Voice, 11 episodes	
2013	Call Me Crazy: A Five Film	Grace	Television film; segment: "Grace"	
2013	Bonnie & Clyde	Blanche Barrow	Miniseries	
2014	Robot Chicken DC Comics Special 2: Villains in Paradise	Lena Luthor	Voice, television special	
2014	Hot in Cleveland	Ivy	Episode: "Rusty Banks Rides Again"	
2015	Repeat After Me	Herself	Episode: "Episode 101"	
2015	Turbo Fast	Gossip Snail	Voice, episode: "Home on Our Own"	
2015	The Lion Guard: Return of the Roar	Tiifu	Voice, television film	
2016–2017	The Lion Guard	Tiifu	Voice, 4 episodes	
2016	Lip Sync Battle Shorties	Herself	Host; TV special (pilot)	
2017	Lip Sync Battle	Herself	Episode: "Sarah Hyland vs. DeAndre Jordan"	
2017	Dimension 404	Chloe	Episode: "Cinethrax"	
2017	Dirty Dancing	Lisa Houseman	Television film	
2017	Shadowhunters	Seelie Queen	2 episodes	
2017	The Lion Guard: The Rise of Scar	Tiifu	Voice, television film	
2019	Veronica Mars	Alyssa	Episode: "Heads You Lose"	
2020	RuPaul's Drag Race All Stars	Herself (guest judge)	Episode: "SheMZ"	
2020	Celebrity Game Face	Herself	Premiere episode	
2021	Epic	Rose	Pilot	
2021–present	Play-Doh Squished	Herself	Host	
2022–2023	Love Island USA	Herself	Host	
2022	Pitch Perfect: Bumper in Berlin	Heidi Miller	Main role	

=== Theatre ===
Year	Title	Role	Notes	Ref.
2002	Annie	Annie	Paper Mill Playhouse	
2006–2007	Grey Gardens	Jacqueline Bouvier (1941)	Broadway	
2014	Hair	Chrissy	Hollywood Bowl	
2024	Little Shop of Horrors	Audrey	Off-Broadway	
2025	The Great Gatsby	Daisy Buchanan	Broadway	
2025–2026	Just in Time	Connie Francis	Broadway	
2026–2027	Cabaret	Sally Bowles	West End	

=== Web ===
Year	Title	Role	Notes	Ref.
2020	Lady Parts	Herself (host)	Also creator and executive producer	
2022	Bone, Marry, Bury	Allie	Voice role; podcast, 7 episodes	

=== Music videos ===
Year	Title	Artist(s)	Ref.
2009	"In the Moonlight (Do Me)"	Reid Ewing	
2016	"Like I Did"	Shane Harper	
2016	"Closer"	Boyce Avenue featuring Sarah Hyland	
2016	"Don't Wanna Know"	Boyce Avenue featuring Sarah Hyland	
2017	"Don't Think Twice, It's All Right"	Sarah Hyland and J. Quinton Johnson	
2018	"Know U Anymore"	BoTalks featuring Sarah Hyland	

== Discography ==
Year	Song(s)	Artist(s)	Album	Ref.
2017	"Don't Think Twice, It's All Right"	J. Quinton Johnson	Dirty Dancing: Original Television Soundtrack	
2017	"(I've Had) The Time of My Life"	Cast of Dirty Dancing (2017)	Dirty Dancing: Original Television Soundtrack	
2017	"Closer" and "Don't Wanna Know"	Boyce Avenue	Cover Sessions Vol. 4	
2018	"Know U Anymore"	BoTalks featuring Sarah Hyland	Non-album single	
2019	"Met At a Party"	Jordan McGraw	Non-album single	
2022	"It Wasn't Me"	Adam DeVine	Pitch Perfect: Bumper in Berlin	
2022	"It Must Have Been Love"	Cast of Pitch Perfect: Bumper in Berlin	Pitch Perfect: Bumper in Berlin	
2022	"Barbie Girl"	Adam DeVine, Flula Borg and Lera Abova	Pitch Perfect: Bumper in Berlin	
2022	"Know My Name" (Piano Version)	Adam DeVine	Pitch Perfect: Bumper in Berlin	
2022	"Know My Name x Where You Are"	Adam DeVine and Flula Borg	Pitch Perfect: Bumper in Berlin	
2022	"99 Luftballons x Take On Me" (Thanksgiving Day Parade Version)	Adam DeVine and Flula Borg	Pitch Perfect: Bumper in Berlin	

== Awards and nominations ==
Organizations	Year	Category	Work	Result	Ref.
Broadway.com Audience Choice Awards	2025	Favorite Replacement (Female)	The Great Gatsby	Nominated	
Critics' Choice Television Awards	2013	Best Supporting Actress in a Comedy Series	Modern Family	Nominated	
Glamour Awards	2014	Comedy Actress	Modern Family	Won	
Kids' Choice Awards	2016	Favorite Female TV Star – Family Show	Modern Family	Nominated	
Screen Actors Guild	2010	Outstanding Ensemble in a Comedy Series	Modern Family (season one)	Nominated	
Screen Actors Guild	2011	Outstanding Ensemble in a Comedy Series	Modern Family (season two)	Won	
Screen Actors Guild	2012	Outstanding Ensemble in a Comedy Series	Modern Family (season three)	Won	
Screen Actors Guild	2013	Outstanding Ensemble in a Comedy Series	Modern Family (season four)	Won	
Screen Actors Guild	2014	Outstanding Ensemble in a Comedy Series	Modern Family (season five)	Won	
Screen Actors Guild	2015	Outstanding Ensemble in a Comedy Series	Modern Family (season six)	Nominated	
Screen Actors Guild	2016	Outstanding Ensemble in a Comedy Series	Modern Family (season seven)	Nominated	
Screen Actors Guild	2017	Outstanding Ensemble in a Comedy Series	Modern Family (season eight)	Nominated	
Teen Choice Awards	2010	Choice TV: Female Breakout Star	Modern Family	Nominated	
Teen Choice Awards	2012	Choice TV: Female Scene Stealer	Modern Family	Nominated	
Teen Choice Awards	2018	Choice Comedy TV Actress	Modern Family	Nominated	
Teen Choice Awards	2019	Choice Comedy TV Actress	Modern Family	Nominated	
Young Artist Awards	2000	Best Young Ensemble – Feature Film or TV Movie	Annie	Nominated	
