= The Closet Case =

- Modern Family episode
- Episode no.: Season 7 Episode 3
- Directed by: Beth McCarthy-Miller
- Written by: Paul Corrigan; Brad Walsh
- Production code: 7ARG03
- Original air date: October 7, 2015

Guest appearances
- Jon Polito as Earl Chambers; Reid Ewing as Dylan Marshal; Irene White as Helen

Episode chronology
← Previous "The Day Alex Left for College"	Next → "She Crazy"
- Modern Family season 7

"The Closet Case" is the third episode of the seventh season of the American sitcom Modern Family, and the series' 147th episode overall. It aired on American Broadcasting Company (ABC) in the United States on October 7, 2015. The episode was written by Paul Corrigan and Brad Walsh, and directed by Beth McCarthy-Miller.

== Plot ==
Haley (Sarah Hyland) and Dylan (Reid Ewing) are back together, and they ask Phil (Ty Burrell) and Claire (Julie Bowen) if Dylan can move in to the basement with Haley. Phil seemingly accepts, but actually wants Claire to say no. Claire decides she doesn't want to be the bad parent in this case and allows it, knowing that Phil will hate living with the fact that Haley and Dylan are having sex under his roof so he will kick Dylan out first. True enough, Phil gets uncomfortable very quickly as the two flaunt their intimate relationship in front of him. However, when he’s had enough, he doesn't order them to stop but instead wants them to sneak around him, leaving Claire to admit defeat. She orders Dylan to leave the next day.

Luke (Nolan Gould) and Manny (Rico Rodriguez) go to Caltech under the guise of visiting Alex (Ariel Winter) but they really they want to chat up cute college girls (Micaela Wittman) who live in Alex's hall. The two manage to find the girls and after some talking the girls agree to make out with them. However, when Luke goes to drink mouthwash in Alex’s room, he finds Alex crying as Sanjay has met someone else at his college and broken up with her. Luke decides to stay and comfort his sister instead of returning to the girls.

While Manny is away, Gloria (Sofía Vergara) goes to his high school to decorate his locker, since a football tradition obliges cheerleaders to decorate the lockers of football players but the cheerleader assigned to Manny refuses to do so. However, Cameron (Eric Stonestreet) as Manny’s coach disagrees with Gloria’s meddling, though it is later revealed that he helped to decorate Manny’s and other footballers’ lockers.

Jay (Ed O'Neill) learns that Mitchell (Jesse Tyler Ferguson) is accepting a short-term job offer from his rival, Earl Chambers (Jon Polito). Though Mitchell sees Chambers as a good person at first, he changes his mind when Chambers uses him to humiliate Jay. The two break into Chambers’ office at night in order to get revenge by having Jay rub his genitals over Chambers' cigars, but Chambers catches them before he does so and the two get into a brawl. Fleeing the office, Jay feels better when Mitchell reveals he stole back for Jay the rolodex that Chambers stole from him decades before.

Driven to despair due to her break-up with the cheating Sanjay, Alex goes back home that night while her family is asleep, only to find Dylan sleeping in her bed. When Dylan tries to include himself in Phil and Claire’s attempt to console Alex, Phil tells him to sleep with Haley, much to Claire’s chagrin.

== Reception ==
=== Ratings ===
In its original U.S. broadcast, "The Closet Case" was watched by 7.99 million people; down by 0.73 from the previous episode.

=== Reviews ===
The episode received mixed reviews. Kyle Fowle of The A.V. Club gave episode a C+, saying "The Closet Case” boasts a lot of the shows worst tendencies, from ridiculous situations to a total lack of thematic cohesion." Shirley Li of Entertainment Weekly was similarly negative, saying that the episode had "too much overreaction and too little laugh-out-loud moments." Liz Estey of TV Fanatic gave the episode a score of 3.5/5, praising Jay and Mitchell's storyline, calling it "definitely entertaining" and saying "it's been nice to see their relationship evolve over the years." However, she criticized Dylan's appearance, believing that he is "funniest in small doses", found Alex's story "really boring", and called the interaction between Cam and Gloria "argumentative without any playfulness."

Zachary Anderson of Out Loud Culture gave the episode a score of 7.5/10, calling Luke's interest in girls "a step in the right direction", and believing that the scene between Luke and Alex "a great moment that shows major signs of maturity for both characters," but disliking Cam and Gloria's storyline, saying he "lost interest three minutes in." Hunter Vogt of The TV Ratings Guide thought that the episode was "pretty good", and especially liked Mitch and Jay's storyline, while he found the others to be "alright" or "mediocre". Lisa Fernandez of Next Projection called it a "decent episode" and gave it a score of 7.1/10. She thought that the episode was "definitely not grating as the premiere was", and "entertaining all around", but found that Gloria and Cam's concern over Manny's locker "seemed an odd thing to concern themselves with."
