= Summer Lovin' (Modern Family) =

- Modern Family episode
- Episode no.: Season 7 Episode 1
- Directed by: Jim Hensz
- Written by: Abraham Higginbotham
- Production code: 7ARG01
- Original air date: September 23, 2015

Guest appearances
- Adam DeVine as Andy; Laura Ashley Samuels as Beth; Suraj Partha as Sanjay; Reid Ewing as Dylan; Susan Egan as Miss Ford; Justin Kirk as Charlie Bingham; Vicki Lewis as Erica; Mai Brunelle as Kid

Episode chronology
← Previous "American Skyper"	Next → "The Day Alex Left for College"
- Modern Family season 7

"Summer Lovin'" is the season premiere of the seventh season of the American sitcom Modern Family. It aired on September 23, 2015, on American Broadcasting Company (ABC). The premiere is directed by Jim Hensz and written by executive-producer Abraham Higginbotham.

== Plot ==
Picking up where the last season left off, Haley (Sarah Hyland) and Claire (Julie Bowen) attempt to stop Andy (Adam DeVine) from proposing to Beth (Laura Ashley Samuels). They are too late, and Haley becomes sad and depressed, with Claire taking advantage of the situation by getting closer to Haley with doing things they normally wouldn't do. Phil (Ty Burrell) and Luke (Nolan Gould) try to end Haley's sadness by taking her to a movie, but on the way over Haley meets Dylan (Reid Ewing), leading to them getting back together. In the meantime, Alex (Ariel Winter) is still dating Sanjay Patel (Suraj Partha) but they have decided to end their relationship when going back to school.

Mitchell (Jesse Tyler Ferguson), after being laid off from his old job, goes through a mid-life crisis and starts investing in painting. He becomes more obsessed with the hobby which begins to concern Cameron (Eric Stonestreet) after Cam learns that Mitchell gave Lily (Aubrey Anderson-Emmons) a ketchup packet for dinner. This leads Cameron to convince Mitchell's old boss Charlie Bingham (Justin Kirk) to hire Mitchell back in his firm, but when Charlie meets Mitchell, he is so inspired by the painting that he decides to let Mitchell continue.

Jay (Ed O'Neill) and Gloria (Sofía Vergara) decide to look for preschools for Joe, but discover the long waiting list after picking a high-class preschool. When looking at another school, Jay is not pleased with the low-quality school, but Gloria convinces him to let Joe attend after seeing how much Joe likes it there.

On July 4, after Claire tells Phil about wanting to reveal to Andy that Haley almost stopped the proposal, Andy overhears the conversation accidentally, making him uncertain about the proposal. In September the family gathers at the Dunphy house for a barbecue, and they are shocked about Andy's sudden weight gain in the last two months. Haley confronts Andy about Beth, with Andy refusing to admit his feelings for Haley and deciding to stay with Beth. Alex breaks up with Sanjay, and Mitchell shows her how to paint, but goes on a rampage after seeing how much better of a painter Alex is. Jay talks to Mitchell about his mid-life crisis and advises him to go back to work, while Alex gets back together with Sanjay.

== Production ==
Before the episode, it was announced that the show was recasting Joe, the son of Jay and Gloria, who has been played by Pierce Wallace for the previous two seasons. On August 7, 2015, the role of Joe had been recast by actor Jeremy Maguire. The table read for the premiere happened on August 3, 2015, being confirmed by Sofía Vergara, with filming commencing a few days after.

== Reception ==
=== Broadcasting ===
The episode was watched by 9.46 million viewers, up 2.46 million people from the previous season's finale.

=== Reviews ===
The episode received generally positive reviews from TV critics. Kyle Fowle of The A.V. Club awarded the episode a B grade, saying "A brisk pace keeps Modern Family feeling fresh in its season premiere". He went on to say "For the most part, tonight’s premiere is a solid, reliable episode of Modern Family, but it’s also one that perhaps shows how hard it will be for the show to remain compelling and surprising week in and week out". Shirley Li of Entertainment Weekly also praised the episode. She said that the show "is off to another heartstrings-tugging start" and is "running on the same formula it′s always run on".

Matt Peri of The Workprint also had good things to say about the episode, awarding it a B+. He said "“Summer Lovin'” works because of its ability to succinctly sum up several of the loose ends it had established from last season" and closed his review by stating that the show "is a veteran in the entertainment dugout. It knows how to get laughs and does so with ease. It’s not the best episode of the show’s growing history but it says something when a sitcom boasts this much quality after six full years". Mark Trammell of TVEquals.com also enjoyed the episode, stating "The show remains as sharp and funny as ever, and if the whole “fat Andy” thing was a bit unfortunate, timing-wise, it was hardly enough to derail the whole process". He closed his review by saying "All in all, a solid enough episode, I thought, and good harbinger that the show will retain the funny moving forward". Liz Estey of TVFanatic.com also praised the episode, despite feeling that the episode didn't focus enough on its best characters, awarding it 3/5. "In Modern Family Season 7 Episode 1 there are some genuinely enjoyable and humorous moments, but the episode spent far too little time exploiting the best characters".

Lisa Fernandez of Next Projection was mixed on the episode, praising Mitch's plot, saying "it′s a hoot watching his dad and Cam try to pull him out of the spiral", while criticizing Haley and Andy's because "in the end it leads to the same thing they had before this storyline started". Hunter Vogt of The TV Ratings Guide was even less positive, calling the episode "disappointing", and believing that it was that way "because the last episode ended on a cliffhanger that they didn′t know how to resolve", negatively comparing the episode to fourth-season premiere "Bringing Up Baby".
