= Clean for a Day =

- Modern Family episode
- Episode no.: Season 7 Episode 12
- Directed by: Beth McCarthy-Miller
- Written by: Paul Corrigan; Brad Walsh
- Production code: 7ARG13
- Original air date: February 10, 2016

Guest appearances
- Josh Casaubon as Gus; Suraj Partha as Sanjay Patel; Christopher Butler as Chirp

Episode chronology
← Previous "Spread Your Wings"	Next → "Thunk in the Trunk"
- Modern Family season 7

Clean for a Day is the twelfth episode of seventh season of the American sitcom Modern Family. It aired on February 10, 2016 on American Broadcasting Company (ABC). The episode is directed by Beth McCarthy-Miller and written by Paul Corrigan and Brad Walsh.

== Plot ==
Haley (Sarah Hyland), Alex (Ariel Winter), and Luke (Nolan Gould) are bummed when Phil (Ty Burrell) announces to them that Claire (Julie Bowen) is making them declutter their rooms before she takes on her responsibilities at Jay's company as its new boss. Phil and Luke disagree with Claire’s obsession to throw out their old things and try without success to save them. Claire has a change of heart when she hears that an old stuffed toy is still working after she threw it in the donation chute. She soon regrets her decision to rid the house of tangible memories, but Phil comforts her when he brings the family to a storage lot full of their old possessions, proving that he didn't dispose of them over the years. He also gets back the stuffed toy from the donation chute, but it soon gets on the family's nerves and he is forced to shut it up with a rock.

While Alex is cleaning her room, she finds an old sweater which belongs to her ex-boyfriend, Sanjay. Haley fails to convince her to cut up the sweater, so the sisters go to Sanjay's house to return his sweater and get closure for Alex, who is still mad after their break-up. But when Sanjay apologizes to Alex and asks to continue their relationship, Haley coaxes her younger sister to give him a second chance, believing him to be sincere.

Elsewhere, Jay (Ed O'Neill) and Gloria (Sofía Vergara) are celebrating the start of Jay’s retirement. But Jay, who does not want to stay inactive, decides to take a flying lesson without Gloria’s knowledge. Gloria's nightmare about Jay falling to his death prompts Cameron (Eric Stonestreet) to follow Jay to his flying lesson. As the two of them are in the plane with the instructor, a series of mishaps involving the meddling Cam results in Jay accidentally knocking the instructor out, but he soon regains consciousness just in time as the pair fear for their lives.

Gloria searches for a new hobby, and Mitchell (Jesse Tyler Ferguson) suggests she find a common interest she could share with Jay. She asks him to teach her everything he knows about golf. Mitchell proves to be a terrible coach and is very disappointed when both Gloria and Lily (Aubrey Anderson-Emmons), to whom he has been giving flute lessons, fire him as their coach and replace him. Gloria studies under an actual golf instructor and Manny (Rico Rodriguez) becomes Lily's personal flute coach. When Jay comes home, he tells Gloria that he does not want her to go golfing with him, while Gloria is adamant that she will not board any plane that he is flying. In the end, both Jay and Gloria admit that they tried a different hobby in order to be close to the other, proving their love for each other.

== Reception ==
Kyle Fowle of The A.V. Club gave the episode a B+.
