= Mr. Peabody & Sherman =

2014 DreamWorks Animation film

- Theatrical release poster
- Directed by: Rob Minkoff
- Screenplay by: Craig Wright
- Based on: "Peabody's Improbable History" from Rocky & Bullwinkle by Jay Ward (Note: Characters and format created by Ted Key)
- Produced by: Alex Schwartz; Denise Nolan Cascino
- Starring: Ty Burrell; Max Charles; Ariel Winter; Stephen Colbert; Leslie Mann; Allison Janney
- Edited by: Michael Andrews
- Music by: Danny Elfman
- Production companies: DreamWorks Animation; Pacific Data Images; Bullwinkle Studios
- Distributed by: 20th Century Fox (Note: In 2018, the film's distribution rights were transferred from 20th Century Fox to Universal Pictures, following NBCUniversal's acquisition of DreamWorks Animation in 2016.)
- Release dates: February 7, 2014 (United Kingdom); March 7, 2014 (United States)
- Running time: 92 minutes
- Country: United States
- Language: English
- Budget: $145 million
- Box office: $275.7 million

Mr. Peabody & Sherman is a 2014 American animated science fiction comedy film produced by DreamWorks Animation and based on characters from the "Peabody's Improbable History" segments of the animated television series Rocky & Friends. It was directed by Rob Minkoff, written by Craig Wright, and features the voices of Ty Burrell, Max Charles, Ariel Winter, Stephen Colbert, Leslie Mann, and Allison Janney. In the film, Mr. Peabody (Burrell) and his adoptive human son Sherman (Charles) use the WABAC, a time machine, to embark on time travel adventures. When Sherman accidentally rips a hole in the universe by taking the WABAC without permission to impress his classmate Penny Peterson (Winter), they must find themselves to repair history and save the future.

The film was originally planned as a live-action/CG film until it was redeveloped into a fully computer-animated film in 2006 when Minkoff joined DreamWorks Animation to direct an adaptation. Andrew Kurtzman was initially set to write the screenplay, based on a pitch by Minkoff and his longtime producing partner Jason Clark.

Mr. Peabody & Sherman was released theatrically in the United States by 20th Century Fox on March 7, 2014 and received generally positive reviews from critics. Despite grossing $275 million worldwide against a budget of $145 million, the film underperformed by DreamWorks' standards, and was a box-office flop. Along with Penguins of Madagascar later that year, it lost the studio $57 million. It was followed by a television series, The Mr. Peabody & Sherman Show, in 2015.

== Plot ==
Mr. Peabody is a highly intelligent anthropomorphic dog who lives in a New York City penthouse with his adopted human son, Sherman. Peabody uses a time machine called the WABAC to teach Sherman history. On Sherman's first day of school, he corrects classmate Penny Peterson about the historicity of the George Washington cherry tree anecdote, resulting in a fight where Penny calls Sherman a dog and puts him in a chokehold. After Sherman bites Penny in self-defense, Peabody is called in for a meeting with Principal Purdy and Ms. Grunion, a child protective services agent. Grunion plans to investigate Peabody's home and remove Sherman from his custody if she deems Peabody unfit to parent.

The next evening, Peabody invites Penny's family over for a dinner party. Sherman takes Penny on an unauthorized trip to the WABAC, and she stays in Ancient Egypt to marry King Tut. Sherman enlists Peabody's help to retrieve her, and Penny agrees to leave after learning that she will be entombed with Tut when he dies. On the return journey to the present, the WABAC loses power, forcing an unplanned stop at the home of Leonardo da Vinci in Renaissance Florence, where Sherman and Penny test da Vinci's flying machine and crash it. Afterwards, Sherman learns of Grunion's intentions from Penny and argues with Peabody as they try to escape a black hole.

A further WABAC malfunction lands the trio in the middle of the Trojan War, where Sherman joins Agamemnon's army. Peabody saves Penny and Sherman from falling off a cliff within the Trojan Horse, appearing to die in the process. Seeking help from the past version of Peabody, Sherman and Penny time-travel back to earlier that evening, leading to an encounter with the Sherman from that timeline. Just as Grunion arrives, the original Peabody returns from Troy, having survived the fall. Grunion attempts to collect both Shermans, but they and the Peabodys merge, generating a cosmic shockwave. When Grunion persists in her efforts to take Sherman away, Peabody bites her, and she calls the New York Police Department.

Peabody, Penny, and Sherman race to the WABAC, but cannot initiate time-travel due to a rip in the space-time continuum caused by the merging. A portal opens above New York and unleashes a deluge of historical figures and artifacts onto the streets as Peabody, Penny, and Sherman try to escape. When the WABAC crashes in Grand Army Plaza, Peabody faces arrest, but Sherman, the Petersons, and the historical figures come to his defense. As the rip worsens, Sherman proposes travelling to the future to repair the damage, and they do. The historical figures are taken back to their respective eras and Agamemnon, smitten with Grunion, takes her with him.

Sherman returns to school, having befriended Penny and strengthened his bond with Peabody. Meanwhile, history has incorporated modern culture, while Agamemnon marries Grunion.

== Voice cast ==
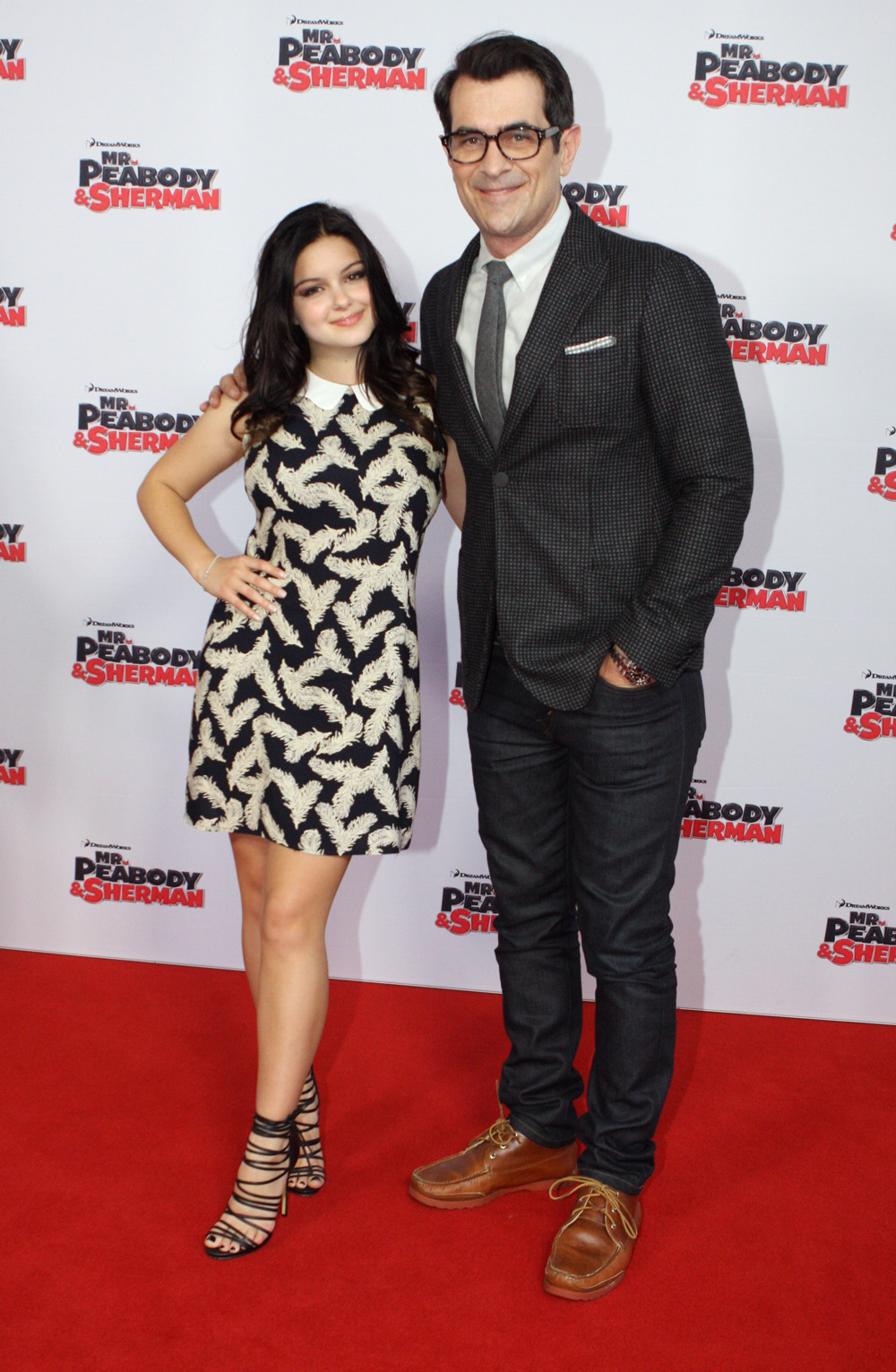
Ariel Winter and Ty Burrell at the film's Australian premiere in Sydney

- Ty Burrell as Hector J. Peabody, a talking intelligent white beagle, business titan, inventor, scientist, Nobel laureate, gourmet chef, and two-time Olympic medalist.
- Max Charles as Sherman, Peabody's 7-year-old adopted son.
- Ariel Winter as Penny Peterson, Mr. and Mrs. Peterson's 7-year-old daughter and Sherman's classmate.
- Stephen Colbert as Paul Peterson, Penny Peterson's father and Patty's husband.
- Leslie Mann as Patty Peterson, Paul's wife and Penny's mother.
- Allison Janney as Edwina Grunion, a stocky and corrupt agent from Bureau of Child Safety and Protection and school counselor.
- Stanley Tucci as Leonardo da Vinci
- Patrick Warburton as King Agamemnon
- Zach Callison as King Tut
- Steve Valentine as Ay, King Tut's Vizier.
- Stephen Tobolowsky as Principal Purdy, the principal of Sherman's school.
- Karan Brar as Mason, one of Sherman's friends.
- Joshua Rush as Carl, another one of Sherman's friends who also wears glasses and is seen in a wheelchair.
- Leila Birch as the WABAC
- Dennis Haysbert as a judge who grants Mr. Peabody the custody of Sherman.
- Adam Alexi-Malle as a French peasant
- Thomas Lennon as Italian Peasant #2

In addition to Leonardo da Vinci, King Agamemnon, and King Tut, the film features other historical figures including Albert Einstein (Mel Brooks), Mona Lisa (Lake Bell), Marie Antoinette (Lauri Fraser), Maximilien Robespierre (Guillaume Aretos), George Washington, Abraham Lincoln, Bill Clinton, Isaac Newton (all voiced by Jess Harnell), Odysseus (Tom McGrath), Ajax the Lesser (Al Rodrigo) and Spartacus (Walt Dohrn).

== Production ==
=== Development ===
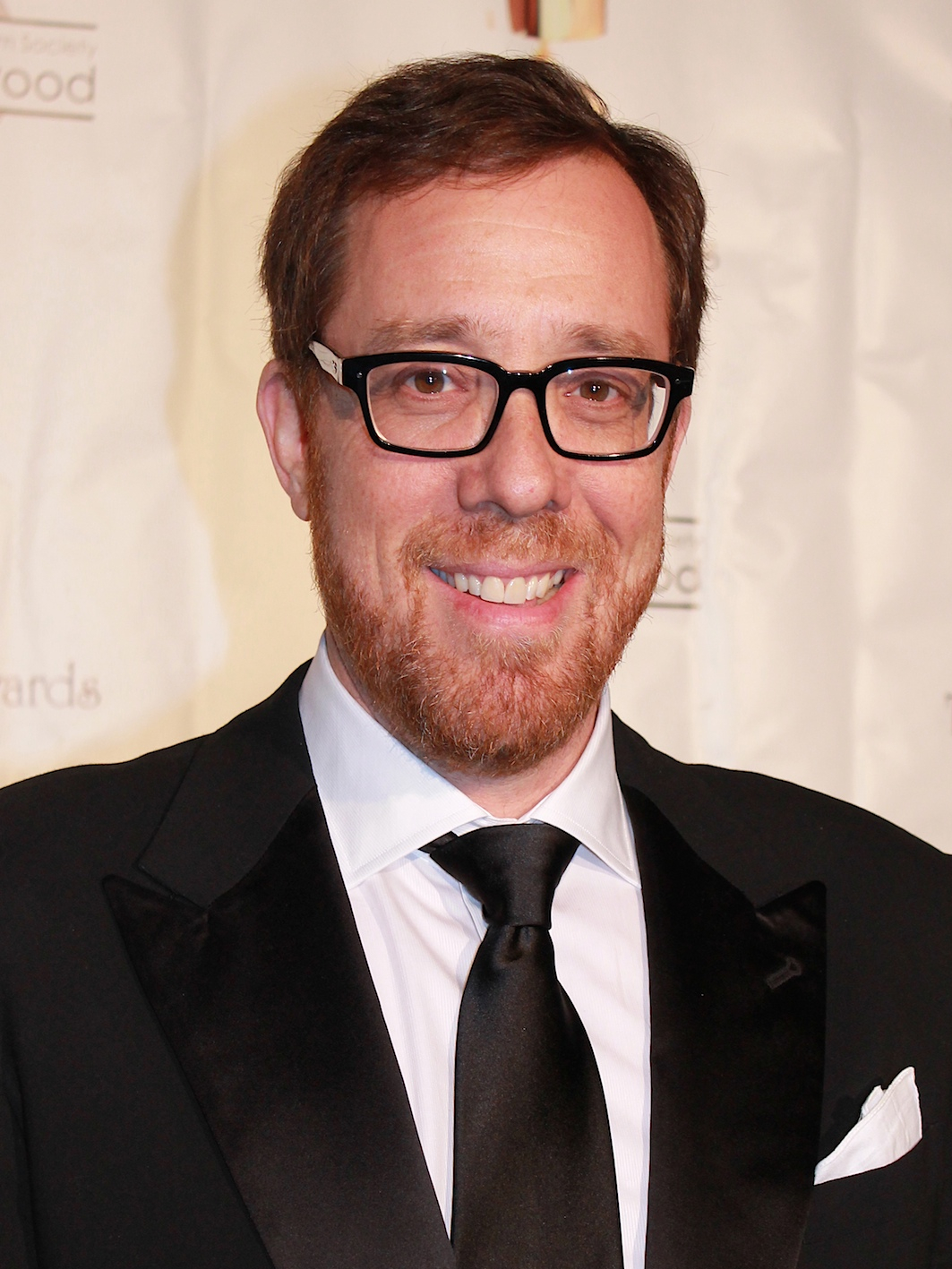
Director Rob Minkoff at the 2014 Annie Awards

Plans for a film starring Mister Peabody and Sherman had existed for several years with director Rob Minkoff. His first attempt to make a feature film dates back to 2003, when it was reported that Minkoff's Sony-based production company Sprocketdyne Entertainment and Bullwinkle Studios would produce a live-action/CG film, with Minkoff as the possible director. The live-action film was not realized, but in 2006, Minkoff joined DreamWorks Animation to direct a computer-animated film adaptation. Andrew Kurtzman was set to write the screenplay, based on the pitch, developed by Minkoff with his longtime producing partner Jason Clark. The final screenplay was written by Craig Wright, with revisions by Robert Ben Garant and Thomas Lennon.

Tiffany Ward, daughter of Jay Ward, one of the creators of the original series, served as an executive producer, whose job was to make sure the film stayed "true to the integrity of the characters". When she was approached by Minkoff ten years before the film's release, she was enthused by his intention to respect the legacy: "What better caretaker for the characters could we ask for than Rob?". The process of perfecting their adaptation took a long time, but she was pleased with the result, which stayed "very true to the original cartoon".

=== Casting ===
In early 2011, Robert Downey Jr. signed on to voice Mr. Peabody, but in March 2012, he was replaced by Ty Burrell. Reportedly, Downey's commitments to The Avengers and other franchises did not allow him to find the time to record his lines. According to Minkoff, Burrell was chosen because his voice "embodied all the different aspects of the character today. Not just the intellect and the suave personality, but the underlying warmth as well." Initially, Tiffany Ward and others at the studio opposed Burrell, who was then relatively unknown, but he managed to convince them with a successful audition. Ward insisted on someone who sounds like Mr. Peabody did in the original series, while Minkoff saw the casting as an opportunity "to modernize the character". He promised her that Burrell would try to "get there and he started watching the show to nail the cadence. He got the underlying connection and he made it his own."

Max Charles, who played young Peter Parker in The Amazing Spider-Man, voiced Sherman. Stephen Colbert voiced Paul Peterson, Leslie Mann, who replaced Ellie Kemper, voiced Peterson's wife, Patty, and Ariel Winter, Burrell's co-star on Modern Family, voiced their daughter Penny. Other voices include Stephen Tobolowsky, Allison Janney, Mel Brooks, Stanley Tucci, Patrick Warburton, Lake Bell, Zach Callison, Karan Brar, and Dennis Haysbert.

=== Animation ===
The visual development process began in 2011 with production designer David James, visual effects supervisor Philippe Denis, and art director Tim Lamb collaborating to establish the film's aesthetic. The team drew inspiration from mid-century modern design, the UPA animation style, and visual trends from the 1950s and 1960s. These influences guided the creation of environments, character poses, and textures, emphasizing clean silhouettes and simple, readable designs to retain the essence of the original show. Translating the minimally designed 2D cartoon characters into 3D posed significant challenges. Early animation tests focused on ensuring expressive clarity for characters like Mr. Peabody and Sherman, particularly regarding their glasses, which obscured facial features. For example, animators developed rules to adjust eyebrow placement above or below the glasses' rims to enhance readability of expressions.

The animation team implemented innovative techniques to reflect the spirit of 2D animation. A system was developed to allow characters to use "multiple limbs", a nod to traditional animation smears and exaggerated movements. This feature enabled animators to add extra limbs to characters during rapid movements, enhancing visual clarity and energy. Another innovation involved incorporating refraction effects in the animation software to simulate the distortion caused by the characters' glasses. This allowed animators to pose characters accurately without relying on time-intensive adjustments during the lighting phase.

The production schedule was organized by sequences, with each sequence lasting two to three minutes. Early sequences, such as the bedroom scene between Mr. Peabody and Sherman, were chosen for their focus on character interactions, providing an opportunity to refine character dynamics. Complex sequences, such as one depicting Sherman growing younger through time, required extended pre-production and weekly review meetings to address unique visual and technical challenges. One notable challenge was the depiction of the antagonist, Ms. Grunion. Her limited screen time necessitated careful animation to establish her motivations and impact as a villain. This process required multiple iterations to ensure her character resonated with the audience.

=== Soundtrack ===
The film's score was composed by Danny Elfman. The soundtrack was released by Relativity Music Group and Green Bay Records on March 3, 2014. Peter Andre wrote and performed for the film a song titled "Kid", which is played during the British version of the end credits, instead of Grizfolk's "Way Back When".

== Release ==
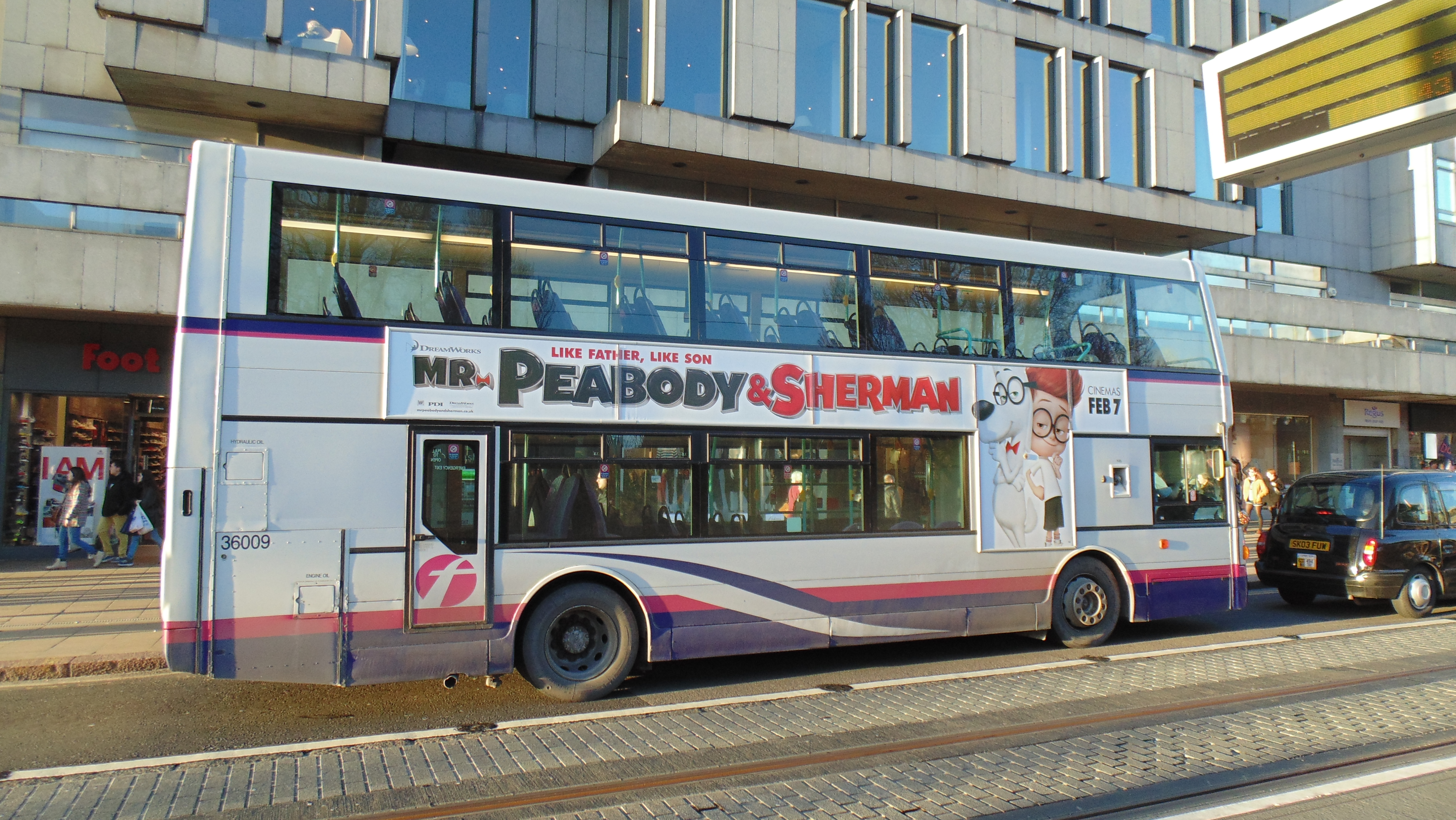
Bus promoting the film in the United Kingdom

Mr. Peabody & Sherman was initially scheduled for November 1, 2013, but was pushed back after Relativity Media positioned Free Birds for that date. It was rescheduled several times, taking its release date from another DreamWorks Animation film, Me and My Shadow. In February 2013, it was announced that Mr. Peabody & Sherman would release on March 7, 2014. The film was distributed by 20th Century Fox in the United States. In the United Kingdom, it released a month earlier, on February 7, 2014.

=== Home media ===
Mr. Peabody & Sherman was released in digital HD, Blu-ray (2D and 3D) and DVD on October 14, 2014. The Blu-ray release also included a new CGI Rocky & Bullwinkle short film. As of February 2015, 3.4 million home entertainment units were sold.

=== Rocky and Bullwinkle short ===
The film was planned to be theatrically accompanied with a DreamWorks Animation short film, Rocky & Bullwinkle, based on the Rocky and Bullwinkle characters from The Rocky and Bullwinkle Show. The short was directed by Gary Trousdale, who is known for co-directing Disney's Beauty and the Beast, produced by Nolan Cascino, and written by Thomas Lennon and Robert Garant. June Foray was set to reprise her role as Rocket "Rocky" J. Squirrel, while Tom Kenny was set to voice Bullwinkle Moose. The short was originally planned as a test for a feature film with the characters. Almost Home, a short based on the DreamWorks Animation film Home, played before the film instead and plans for a Rocky and Bullwinkle movie was ultimately scrapped.

== Reception ==
=== Box office ===
Mr. Peabody & Sherman grossed $111.5 million in the United States and Canada, and $164.2 million in other countries, for a worldwide total of $275.7 million. With a budget of $145 million, the film underperformed, forcing DreamWorks Animation to take a $57 million write-down on behalf of the film.

In the United States and Canada, Mr. Peabody & Sherman was released alongside 300: Rise of an Empire, and was projected to gross $30 million from 3,934 theatres in its opening weekend. The film earned $8 million on its opening day, and opened to number two in its first weekend, with $32.2 million, behind 300: Rise of an Empire. Forbes attributed the underperformance to lackluster marketing and lack of interest for the youngest moviegoers, while Katharine Trendacosta of Gizmodo felt the low opening was because it was "too clever" for audiences. In its second weekend, the film moved up to number one, grossing $21.8 million. In its third weekend, the film dropped to number three, grossing $11.8 million. In its fourth weekend, the film dropped to number four, grossing $9.1 million. Mr. Peabody & Sherman completed its theatrical run in the United States and Canada on August 14, 2014.

=== Critical response ===
Mr. Peabody & Sherman has an approval rating of 81% based on 138 professional reviews on the review aggregator website Rotten Tomatoes, with an average rating of 6.6/10. The site's critical consensus reads, "Mr. Peabody & Sherman offers a surprisingly entertaining burst of colorful all-ages fun, despite its dated source material and rather convoluted plot." Metacritic (which uses a weighted average) assigned Mr. Peabody & Sherman a score of 59 out of 100 based on 34 critics, indicating "mixed or average" reviews. Audiences polled by CinemaScore gave the film an average grade of "A" on an A+ to F scale.

Peter Bradshaw of The Guardian felt that the film "takes a little while for the audience to get up to speed, but once this is achieved, there's an awful lot of unexpected fun to be had," while Mark Kermode of the sister paper The Observer declared, "DreamWorks' latest offers a fairly consistent stream of sight gags and vocal slapstick, even as the plot veers wildly down a wormhole in the time-space continuum." A. O. Scott of The New York Times gave the film a positive review, saying, "This DreamWorks Animation production, directed by Rob Minkoff (Stuart Little, The Lion King) from a screenplay by Craig Wright, is not perfect, but it is fast-moving, intermittently witty and pretty good fun." Claudia Puig of USA Today gave the film two and a half stars out of four, saying, "Mr. Peabody & Sherman is lively, educational and intermittently amusing. The fun, however, grows strained and formulaic as the movie goes on."

Leslie Felperin of The Hollywood Reporter gave the film a positive review, saying, "The film's saving grace is its character design and use of 3D techniques to speed things up in every sense when the plot starts to flag." Liam Lacey of The Globe and Mail gave the film two and a half stars out of four, saying, "Mr. Peabody is fast-paced and jammed with rib-poking historical references, but it couldn't be called witty, even on the broadly winking level of the original cartoon." Stephen Whitty of the Newark Star-Ledger gave the film three out of four stars, saying, "Fifty years ago, animated entertainment was a lot quieter. But that was my Mr. Peabody & Sherman. This is someone else's. And it should give them, and even a few open-minded parents, almost just as much giggly fun." Owen Gleiberman of Entertainment Weekly gave the film a B, saying, "Mr. Peabody & Sherman has a zesty time mixing and matching historical figures, from Marie Antoinette to George Washington. Yet the movie never, to my mind, conjured quite the quirky effervescence of such brainiac animated features as the Jimmy Neutron or SpongeBob SquarePants movies." Michael O'Sullivan of The Washington Post gave the film one out of four stars, saying, "By visual standards alone, the characters, rendered in eye-popping 3-D, resemble nothing so much as Macy's Thanksgiving Day Parade floats. They're just as lifeless and inexpressive, too." Sean Daly of the Tampa Bay Times gave the film a B, saying, "Before getting sucked into a what-the-wormhole ending that will scramble young brains, time-travel romp Mr. Peabody & Sherman is a fast, fun 3-D getaway."

=== Accolades ===
Accolades received by Mr. Peabody & Sherman
Award	Date of ceremony	Category	Recipient(s)	Result	Ref.
3D Creative Arts Awards	January 28, 2015	Best Feature Film – Animation	Mr. Peabody & Sherman	Nominated	
Annie Awards	January 31, 2015	Outstanding Achievement for Animated Effects in an Animated Production	Fangwei Lee, Krzysztof Rost, Jihyun Yoon, and Robert Chen	Nominated	
Annie Awards	January 31, 2015	Outstanding Achievement for Character Design in a Feature Production	Timothy Lamb and Joe Moshier	Nominated	
Annie Awards	January 31, 2015	Outstanding Achievement for Music in a Feature Production	Danny Elfman	Nominated	
Annie Awards	January 31, 2015	Outstanding Achievement for Production Design in an Animated Feature Production	David James, Ruben Perez, Priscilla Wong, Timothy Lamb, and Alexandre Puvilland	Nominated	
British Academy Children's Awards	November 23, 2014	Kid's Vote — Film	Mr. Peabody & Sherman	Nominated	
Golden Trailer Awards	May 30, 2014	Best Original Score	"Who's the Dog" (Buddha Jones)	Nominated	
Golden Trailer Awards	May 30, 2014	Best Animation/Family TV Spot	"Who's the Dog" (Buddha Jones)	Nominated	
Golden Trailer Awards	May 30, 2014	Best Pre-show Theatrical Advertising for a Brand	"Odeon Premier Club" (Toy Box Entertainment)	Nominated	
Golden Trailer Awards	May 30, 2014	Best Viral Video or Campaign	"History Greatest Mystery" (Toy Box Entertainment)	Nominated	
Hollywood Music in Media Awards	November 4, 2014	Best Original Song in an Animated Film	Peter Andre for "Kid"	Nominated	
Hollywood Music in Media Awards	November 4, 2014	Best Original Score in an Animated Film	Danny Elfman	Nominated	

== Television series ==
An animated television series featuring Mr. Peabody and Sherman, titled The Mr. Peabody & Sherman Show premiered on October 9, 2015, on Netflix. The series is based on the 1960s short film segments that aired as part of The Rocky and Bullwinkle Show, and it also takes some elements from the film. After being revealed as time travelers at the end of the film, Mr. Peabody and Sherman launch a live TV variety show, hosting various historical figures at their Manhattan penthouse. The series is hand-drawn, with the Vancouver-based DHX Media providing the animation. Mr. Peabody is voiced by Chris Parnell, while Max Charles reprises his role as Sherman from the film. A soundtrack for the series was released digitally on October 2, 2015, and on CD in December 2015. Published by Lakeshore Records, the album features original score and the opening theme song by Eric Goldman and Michael Corcoran (a.k.a. The Outfit), and new original songs by Jukebox the Ghost, JD McPherson, Wordsworth and Prince Paul, and Ra Ra Riot. In April 2023, the series was removed from Netflix, along with Turbo Fast, due to licensing agreements.
