= Spread Your Wings (disambiguation) =

"Spread Your Wings" is a song by Queen from their album News of the World.

Spread Your Wings may also refer to:

- "Spread Your Wings", a song by Gotthard from their album Bang!
- "Spread Your Wings", a song by Ted Nugent from his album If You Can't Lick 'Em... Lick 'Em
- "Spread Your Wings", a song by Robbie Williams from his album Intensive Care
- Spread Your Wings (Modern Family), an episode of the television series Modern Family
- Spread Your Wings (film), a 2019 film directed by Nicolas Vanier
