= Playdates (Modern Family) =

- Modern Family episode
- Episode no.: Season 7 Episode 10
- Directed by: Claire Scanlon
- Written by: Jeffrey Richman
- Production code: 7ARG09
- Original air date: January 6, 2016

Guest appearances
- Ray Liotta as himself; Barbra Streisand as herself (voice); Keegan-Michael Key as Tom Delaney; Christine Lakin as Lisa Delaney; Tom Larochelle as Rob; Orson Bean as Marty; Mia Barron as Vicky; Kate McDaniel as Carol; Omar Leyva as Map Seller; Evan Engel as First Waiter; Brandon Espy as Second Waiter; Hudson West as Monte

Episode chronology
| ← Previous "White Christmas" | Next → "Spread Your Wings" |
- Modern Family season 7

"Playdates" is the tenth episode of the seventh season of the American sitcom Modern Family. It aired on January 6, 2016, on American Broadcasting Company (ABC). The episode is directed by Claire Scanlon and written by Jeffrey Richman.

== Plot ==
Haley (Sarah Hyland), Alex (Ariel Winter), and Luke (Nolan Gould) are surprised when Mitchell (Jesse Tyler Ferguson) shows up in order to cash a coupon they gave him for his belated birthday. It turns out they actually forgot his birthday this year, so they scramble in order to give him a good day. When they're out of ideas, they decide to show him an impromptu tour of celebrity homes during which Mitchell meets actor Ray Liotta. The kids apologize to him, since he is the first who calls them and he always gives them extraordinary gifts. Mitch reassures them by telling them that he knew that they didn't plan something. Ray decides to introduce him to Barbra Streisand, and, though Mitch can only hear her voice, it makes him happy.

Phil (Ty Burrell) and Claire (Julie Bowen) have a lunch with another couple, Tom and Lisa Delaney, whom they met during a vacation in Cabo. Despite the couple's wealth, every time they eat together, Phil always picks up the tab while the couple ignores the check. Claire insists Phil do the same this time, but he still wants to pay the bill. After a long game of "who will break first?", Phil finally and reluctantly admits that he and Tom made a bet in Cabo as to which man could sneak more roasted crickets into his wife's food. Phil had lost by only feeding Claire three crickets to Tom feeding Lisa six, and he now has to pay for the next five of the couples' dates in a row. However, both Claire and Lisa are furious at their husbands for "poisoning" them and vow to do the same to them in the future. They leave, not knowing that Phil and Tom had secretly been in the middle of another cricket bet, which Phil has again lost, this time by only feeding Claire one cricket to Tom feeding Lisa two.

Elsewhere, Jay (Ed O'Neill) and Gloria (Sofía Vergara) also have a playdate with a couple whose son is the same age as Joe (Jeremy Maguire). It turns out the couple have similarities with them, especially the husband, Marty, who describes Jay as old as him. This infuriates Jay who still wants to prove that he is not an old man, but Gloria reassures him saying that age also can affect women. Jay then introduces Marty to Netflix by mail, but it's Marty who has the last word with streaming. At the same time, Manny (Rico Rodriguez) has a puberty problem with his mustache that only he can see.

Cameron (Eric Stonestreet) has invited the family who live upstairs for lunch. He realizes that Lily (Aubrey Anderson-Emmons) could have a crush on the family's son. He gives her some advice in order to make her flirt with him. However, his plan backfires when he sees that Lily actually has feelings for the family's dad, which forces him to intervene and open his heart to his daughter about his first crush.

== Reception ==
=== Broadcasting ===
The episode was watched by 8.35 million viewers.

=== Reviews ===
Kyle Fowle of The A.V. Club awarded the episode a B+ grade, saying: "It's the best episode of the season in terms of punchlines, timing, and pacing."
