= Mr. Peabody =

Anthropomorphic cartoon dog

- The Adventures of Rocky and Bullwinkle and Friends character
- Mr. Peabody as he appears in Rocky and His Friends (1959)
- First appearance: Rocky and His Friends (1959)
- Created by: Ted Key
- Voiced by: Bill Scott (1959–1985); Jeff Bennett (1998); Matthew Senreich (2013; Robot Chicken); Ty Burrell (2014); Chris Parnell (2015–2017); Gary Busey (2016; Alternate Universe Peabody)

In-universe information
- Species: Beagle
- Gender: Male
- Relatives: Sherman Peabody (adoptive son)
- Nationality: British

Mr. Peabody is an anthropomorphic cartoon dog who appeared in the late 1950s and early 1960s television animated series The Adventures of Rocky and Bullwinkle and Friends, produced by Jay Ward. Peabody appears in the "Peabody's Improbable History" segments created by Ted Key, and he was voiced by Bill Scott. He also appears in the 2014 animated film, Mr. Peabody & Sherman and its spin-off TV series, The Mr. Peabody & Sherman Show (2015–2017).

== Peabody's Improbable History ==
=== Plot ===
The cartoons are about Peabody, who graduated from Harvard when he was 3 years old. ("Wagna cum laude"). Peabody has accomplished many things in his life as a business magnate, inventor, scientist, Nobel laureate, gourmand, and two-time Olympic medalist.

In the first episode, Peabody meets an orphan named Sherman (voiced by Walter Tetley), whom he saves from some bullies. He adopts Sherman after a court appearance that also involved him having to get the President and the government to help him out. Upon inventing the Wayback Machine and doing different upgrades, Peabody and Sherman meet various historic figures and help out with their plights. Each installment ends with Peabody making a pun on something revolving around the episode's time-traveling trip. An example of such a pun is "Marie Antoinette could have avoided trouble by making an edict for the people to eat cake, but she could not have her cake and edict too."

=== Episodes ===
This is the list of 91 episodes which aired in 1959 and 1960:

1. "Show Opening" - This episode details how Mr. Peabody adopted Sherman and how he invented the Wayback Machine to travel back in time that involved it being upgraded twice. They travel in time where they meet a used chariot salesman and later Ben Franklin.
2. "Napoleon"
3. "Lord Nelson"
4. "Wyatt Earp"
5. "King Arthur"
6. "Franz Schubert"
7. "Lucrezia Borgia"
8. "Sir Walter Raleigh"
9. "Robert Fulton"
10. "Annie Oakley"
11. "Jesse James"
12. "The Wright Brothers"
13. "George Armstrong Custer"
14. "Alfred Nobel"
15. "Marco Polo"
16. "Richard the Lionhearted"
17. "Don Juan"
18. "William Tecumseh Sherman"
19. "First Kentucky Derby"
20. "P. T. Barnum"
21. "Stanley and Livingstone"
22. "Louis Pasteur"
23. "Robin Hood"
24. "Robinson Crusoe"
25. "Ponce de León"
26. "Leonardo da Vinci"
27. "John L. Sullivan"
28. "Paul Revere"
29. "Confucius"
30. "Nero"
31. "Captain Matthew Clift"
32. "Vasco Núñez de Balboa"
33. "Peter Cooper"
34. "The Battle of Bunker Hill"
35. "The Pony Express"
36. "Stephen Decatur"
37. "Alexander Graham Bell"
38. "Commander Peary"
39. "Pancho Villa"
40. "Lord Francis Douglas"
41. "Sitting Bull"
42. "Christopher Columbus"
43. "The French Foreign Legion"
44. "Guglielmo Marconi"
45. "Scotland Yard"
46. "John Holland"
47. "Louis XVI"
48. "Francisco Pizarro"
49. "Daniel Boone"
50. "William Shakespeare"
51. "Zebulon Pike"
52. "The First Golf Match"
53. "William Tell"
54. "James McNeill Whistler"
55. "Ferdinand Magellan"
56. "Ludwig van Beethoven"
57. "Calamity Jane"
58. "Cornwallis' Surrender"
59. "The First Indian Nickel"
60. "Jules Verne"
61. "Casanova"
62. "Lawrence of Arabia"
63. "Bonnie Prince Charlie"
64. "Paul Reuter"
65. "Johannes Gutenberg"
66. "Buffalo Bill"
67. "Hans Christian Ørsted"
68. "Leif Ericson"
69. "John Sutter"
70. "Sir Isaac Newton"
71. "Kit Carson"
72. "The First Caveman"
73. "Geronimo"
74. "The Great Wall of China"
75. "The Marquis of Queensbury"
76. "Jim Bowie"
77. "Edgar Allan Poe"
78. "Charge of the Light Brigade"
79. "The Royal Mounted Police"
80. "The First Bullfight"
81. "The Building of the Great Pyramid"
82. "John James Audubon"
83. "Mata Hari"
84. "Galileo"
85. "Wellington at Waterloo"
86. "Florence Nightingale"
87. "Henry the VIII"
88. "The First Indianapolis Auto Race"
89. "Captain Kidd"
90. "The Texas Rangers"
91. "Cleopatra"

== Mr. Peabody & Sherman (film) ==
An animated feature film based on the characters of Mister Peabody and Sherman had been in development at DreamWorks Animation since 2007. The feature was directed by Rob Minkoff, who is known for co-directing The Lion King for Disney. In January 2011, it was announced that an animated film titled Mr. Peabody & Sherman would be released on March 14, 2014. Robert Downey Jr. was announced to voice Mr. Peabody, but in March 2012, he was replaced by Ty Burrell. Max Charles, the actor who played young Peter Parker in The Amazing Spider-Man, voiced Sherman. In June 2012, it was reported that Mr. Peabody & Sherman's release date had been moved up to November 8, 2013. Stephen Colbert voiced Paul Peterson, Penny's father; Leslie Mann voiced Peterson's wife, Patty, and Ariel Winter (Burrell's Modern Family co-star) voiced their daughter Penny. Also joining the cast were Allison Janney and Stephen Tobolowsky. In September 2012, the release date was moved up for a week to November 1, 2013. It finally had an official release on March 7, 2014. The film was produced by Alex Schwartz and Denise Cascino, and written by Craig Wright.

The film focused much more on Mr. Peabody and Sherman's personal lives that prompt a series of time-traveling mishaps with the WABAC machine, forcing the pair to put things on track before the space-time continuum is irreparably destroyed.

Unlike the show, Mr. Peabody treats Sherman as a beloved son, whom he adopted as an infant rather than as a pet and assistant, and the machine is more futuristic with an autonomous aircraft function. Also, a third member of the team is introduced, Penny, who is Sherman's rival, and later, best friend and love interest.

== The Mr. Peabody & Sherman Show ==
An animated television series starring Mr. Peabody and Sherman premiered in October 2015 on Netflix. It takes the form of a talk show named The Mr. Peabody & Sherman Show, with Mr. Peabody and Sherman hosting historical guests. The series is largely inspired by the 1960s short segments, including its hand-drawn animation and comedy, but it also integrates some elements from the 2014 film. Mr. Peabody is voiced by Chris Parnell, while Max Charles reprises his role as Sherman from the film. In this series, Peabody's family is further explored, with his foster parents appearing in the first season's ninth episode, and his distant Uncle Duke appearing in a time travel adventure in the fourth season's sixth episode.

== Other appearances ==
=== Television ===
- In The Simpsons' fifth Halloween special ("Treehouse of Horror V"), in the Time and Punishment segment, Homer Simpson finds himself able to travel through time by means of a magic toaster and claims he is the "first non-Brazilian person to travel backwards through time". He then comes across Mr. Peabody (voiced by Dan Castellaneta) and Sherman (voiced by Nancy Cartwright). Mr. Peabody then corrects Homer, saying he is actually the second. Sherman then agrees with him, only for Mr. Peabody to respond with "Quiet, you". The characters Kang and Kodos later take on Peabody and Sherman's appearances (though still in their helmets and with their tentacles) due to Homer's meddling with the time stream.
- In Time Squad, the character Otto is modeled on Sherman, and Larry partially on Peabody.
- In the Family Guy episode "The Kiss Seen Around the World", Peter Griffin and Brian Griffin travel back in time to see Christopher Columbus. The two don similar looks to Mister Peabody and Sherman; the flashback also parodies the format of the show, with the two going back in time and Brian (Mr. Peabody) teaching Peter (Sherman).
- In the Wander Over Yonder episode "The Time Bomb", a dog resembling Mr. Peabody appears as one of the racers in the Galactic Conjunction 6000 race.
- He and Sherman made a small cameo in the first chapter of Moosebumps! in The Adventures of Rocky and Bullwinkle.

=== Tributes ===
- The 1985 film Back to the Future included a 1955 character named Otis Peabody with a son named Sherman, a tribute to the animated characters. Unlike the famed duo, this Sherman and Mr. Peabody are hostile toward Marty McFly and his time machine, mistaking Marty for an evil alien and his DeLorean time machine for a spaceship.
- The Wayback Machine, which records extant Internet webpages on https://archive.org (USA), is named after Mr. Peabody's WABAC machine.
- The comic series 'Gold Digger' by Fred Perry includes a long running villain based loosely on this show. Dr Alfred Peachbody and his trained attack-boy Benji are trying to change history to enable their dominance over the humans from their alternative future with their first appearance in the comic involving them trying to sabotage the person who invented the dog whistle. They also take part in a crossover event with Ben Dunn's Ninja High School comic.
