= The Verdict (Modern Family) =

- Modern Family episode
- Episode no.: Season 7 Episode 5
- Directed by: Alisa Statman
- Written by: Chuck Tathum
- Production code: 7ARG05
- Original air date: October 21, 2015

Guest appearances
- Kevin Chamberlin as Monty; Ron Perkins as Judge; Tijuana Ricks as Attorney Defense; Vicki Lewis as Erica; Marsha Kramer as Margaret; Craig Welzbacher as Mark; Lateefah Holder as Nicole; Philip Anthony Rodriguez as Tim; Casey Mahaffy as Dom; Christopher Darga as Lou; Spencer McNeil as Ruben; Kevin Bertson as Raymond; Jackson Garner as Tommy

Episode chronology
← Previous "She Crazy"	Next → "The More You Ignore Me"
- Modern Family season 7

"The Verdict" is the fifth episode of the seventh season of the American sitcom Modern Family. It aired on October 21, 2015 on American Broadcasting Company (ABC). The episode is directed by Alisa Statman and written by Chuck Tathum.

== Plot ==
Gloria (Sofía Vergara) tells Jay (Ed O'Neill) that she got selected for jury duty. But in the audience court, her behavior causes her to get expelled and removes her from being a juror. In Gloria's absence, Jay has no choice but to be a volunteer parent at Joe's (Jeremy Maguire) preschool. He has a hard time to adjust himself, especially when a little boy calls him an old man, causing him to criticize him about his big ears. Jay also has the feeling that Joe totally ignores him until, at the end of the day, Joe asks him to come the next day. Jay is glad to have been noticed by his son.

Since Jay can't come to work, it's Claire (Julie Bowen) who has the company in her hands for the day. By a coincidence, it's also the day where parents are allowed to bring their daughters to work. Claire seizes the opportunity by taking Haley (Sarah Hyland) and Alex (Ariel Winter) to her place. However, Claire suffers from a lot of bad luck as each time she tries to make the right decision, only to see things worsen. Claire tries to show her daughters that she can control everything, but when she mistakes one employee who retires for one another, because they have the same names, she gives up. Haley and Alex reassure her, telling her that she is their mom and they know she manages to do a good job in this part of her life.

Meanwhile, Phil (Ty Burrell) accompanies Luke's (Nolan Gould) and Manny's (Rico Rodriguez) classes in Community Service. A man (Kevin Chamberlin) who knows Phil approaches him and asks him to give him some money since he left his wallet and his phone in his car. Phil agrees but can't remember where he met this man who seems to know him a lot. This causes him to be torn between Manny who says that he did a good deed and Luke who believes his dad had been scammed. Phil eventually rallies on Luke's side and, with help of the teenagers (save Manny) throws garbage in the man's car, only to learn that this man is actually the obstetrician who helped with Luke's birth.

Mitch (Jesse Tyler Ferguson) and Cam (Eric Stonestreet) learn that their friends Raymond and J Marcus broke-up. This causes Mitchell to invite Raymond to a party they planned to organize with their friends. As neither of them can decide what is the best option, it's Gloria who helps to mediate. But things take another turn when Mitchell admits that if ever he and Cam break-up, Cam would be excluded. Gloria concludes that Mitchell could have feelings for Raymond, and he reluctantly admits that he is the Raymond in their couple.

== Reception ==
=== Broadcasting ===
The episode was watched by 7.80 million viewers.

=== Reviews ===
La Toya Ferguson of The A.V. Club awarded the episode a C grade, saying "A good episode of Modern Family depends on just how funny it can make the expected."
