= She Crazy =

- Modern Family episode
- Episode no.: Season 7 Episode 4
- Directed by: Gail Mancuso
- Written by: Elaine Ko
- Production code: 7ARG04
- Original air date: October 14, 2015

Episode chronology
← Previous "The Closet Case"	Next → "The Verdict"
- Modern Family season 7

"She Crazy" is the fourth episode of the seventh season of the American sitcom Modern Family. It aired on October 14, 2015 on American Broadcasting Company (ABC). The premiere is directed by Gail Mancuso and written by executive-producer Elaine Ko.

== Plot ==
It has been a month since Phil took the duck eggs that he found in the episode "The Day Alex Left for College", and he is preparing a "duck village" for them to hatch in spite of the rest of his family's suspicions of the egg's viability. Claire then calls Mitch and Lily over to help with the duck village, but Mitch capitalizes on Luke's driving instructor's cancellation and instead agrees help him with his driving, leaving Lily to assist Phil with the project, much to her vexation. Phil takes Lily out to improve the duck village after it proved to be a hazard to the eggs, and retells the story of how he acquired them to Lily. This piqued Lily's curiosity as to why the eggs were abandoned, and projects the eggs' "orphaned" state onto her situation of being adopted.

A couple of college frat boys are renting the upstairs apartment of Mitch and Cam's residence and Cam tries to befriend them by inviting them down to his apartment to play catchball and chugging different types of alcoholic beverages to their amusement due to his need to always be liked; thus triggering Mitch's displeasure. Things go even worse when the frat boys convince Cam to take part in a prank in which he pretends to be a pizza man and steals a goat. Mitch catches him walking home while helping Luke drive and tells him that he is likable as he is and that he doesn't have to change so that people will be fond of him, which gets him to change his behavior.

Manny has a new crush on a girl named Chelsea and he wants to ask her out; meanwhile Gloria attempts to meet her favorite actor by stalking her to a hotel. However, when she sees her, she loses her confidence and becomes incoherent. Manny sees Gloria's actions and loses confidence, but later considers it as a learning experience and calls Chelsea to ask her out on a coffee date on Gloria's advice, to which she says yes.

Claire pitches new closet ideas to her dad and his creative team for the first time, only to be rejected since those ideas have been pitched already in the past. Discouraged, she goes to a lunch meeting with Jay and a client when Jay apologizes for being too harsh on her in the meeting as he is tired of having to hear mediocre business ideas, and encourages her to keep trying. Later, she shares her ideas with the aforementioned client, only to grab the blueprint for Phil's duck village filled with birdseeds; this makes a swarm of birds fly to her table to eat them, ruining the meeting. As she arrives home, Phil asks her to tend to the eggs; just then the eggs starts to hatch, prompting Phil to head home. When he does, all the eggs have already hatched; worse, the ducklings imprint on Claire and follow her around the house.

== Reception ==
=== Broadcasting ===
The episode was watched by 7.88 million people, down 0.11 from the previous episode.
