= Modern Family season 7 =

Modern Family
- Season 7
- DVD cover
- Starring: Ed O'Neill; Sofía Vergara; Julie Bowen; Ty Burrell; Jesse Tyler Ferguson; Eric Stonestreet; Sarah Hyland; Ariel Winter; Nolan Gould; Rico Rodriguez; Aubrey Anderson-Emmons; Jeremy Maguire
- No. of episodes: 22

Release
- Original network: ABC
- Original release: September 23, 2015 – May 18, 2016

Season chronology
- ← Previous; Season 6 Next → Season 8

The seventh season of the American television sitcom Modern Family aired on ABC from September 23, 2015 to May 18, 2016.

This season was ordered on May 7, 2015. The season was produced by Steven Levitan Productions and Picador Productions in association with 20th Century Fox Television, with creators Steven Levitan and Christopher Lloyd as showrunners.

== Cast ==
=== Main cast ===
- Ed O'Neill as Jay Pritchett
- Sofía Vergara as Gloria Pritchett
- Julie Bowen as Claire Dunphy
- Ty Burrell as Phil Dunphy
- Jesse Tyler Ferguson as Mitchell Pritchett
- Eric Stonestreet as Cameron Tucker
- Sarah Hyland as Haley Dunphy
- Ariel Winter as Alex Dunphy
- Nolan Gould as Luke Dunphy
- Rico Rodriguez as Manny Delgado
- Aubrey Anderson-Emmons as Lily Tucker-Pritchett
- Jeremy Maguire as Joe Pritchett

=== Recurring cast ===
- Adam DeVine as Andy Bailey
- Reid Ewing as Dylan Marshall
- Spenser McNeil as Reuben Rand
- Joe Mande as Ben

=== Guest cast ===
- Justin Kirk as Charlie Bingham
- Laura Ashley Samuels as Beth
- Suraj Partha as Sanjay Patel
- Jon Polito as Earl Chambers
- Brooke Sorenson as Tammy LaFontaine
- Catherine O'Hara as Debra Radcliffe
- Andrea Martin as Fig
- Ray Liotta as himself
- Barbra Streisand as herself (voice only)
- Keegan-Michael Key as Tom
- June Squibb as Auntie Alice
- Ernie Hudson as Miles
- Nathan Lane as Pepper Saltzman
- Christian Barillas as Ronaldo
- Kevin Daniels as Longines
- Mekia Cox as Angie
- Dana Powell as Pam Tucker
- Shelley Long as DeDe Pritchett
- Simon Templeman as Simon Hastings
- Dominic Sherwood as James
- Illeana Douglas as Janet
- Emmitt Richardson as Deran

== Production ==
Modern Family was renewed for a seventh season on May 7, 2015, by ABC. It was announced that the show will be recasting Joe, the son of Jay and Gloria, who has been played by Pierce Wallace for the previous two seasons. On August 7, 2015, the role of Joe had been recast by actor Jeremy Maguire. The table read for the premiere happened on August 3, 2015, being confirmed by Sofia Vergara. Filming for the seventh season began shortly after the table read.

== Episodes ==
No. overall	No. in season	Title	Directed by	Written by	Original release date	Prod. code	U.S. viewers (millions)
145	1	"Summer Lovin'"	Jim Hensz	Abraham Higginbotham	September 23, 2015	7ARG01	9.46
Haley learns about Andy's feelings for her, but does not interfere with Andy's proposal to Beth - leading her to get back together with Dylan. Alex, like so many college freshmen, finds herself in an interesting boyfriend situation and does not want to break up with him. Mitchell gets laid off and begins to paint, freaking Cameron out, leading Cameron to try to find a job for him. Jay and Gloria look at preschools for Joe, and Andy and Haley learn their feelings for each other but decide to not be together.
146	2	"The Day Alex Left for College"	Jeffrey Walker	Danny Zuker	September 30, 2015	7ARG02	8.72
Alex leaves home for college earlier than Phil and Claire thought, leaving Haley in charge to give her some advice. Luke reluctantly agrees to assist Phil at an open house, rather than hang out with his friends. Claire, Jay, Joe, Manny, and Gloria make up an excuse in order to skip Lily's soccer game. Mitchell finds a new job in coaching his daughter's team with Cameron's help.
147	3	"The Closet Case"	Beth McCarthy-Miller	Paul Corrigan & Brad Walsh	October 7, 2015	7ARG03	7.99
Phil helps Haley convince Claire to allow Dylan to move in temporarily, but soon changes his mind after seeing how intimate living together is. Mitchell takes on a much needed consulting job for Jay's biggest rival - Closets, Closets, Closets, Closets! Gloria and Cameron disagree on how to handle Manny's girl problem at school.
148	4	"She Crazy"	Gail Mancuso	Elaine Ko	October 14, 2015	7ARG04	7.88
Phil and Lily bond while building a habitation for ducks. Claire is nervous about pitching some ideas for Jay's closet company. Manny and Gloria both have crushes with whom they have trouble speaking and Cam befriends his new rents, a fraternity.
149	5	"The Verdict"	Alisa Statman	Chuck Tatham	October 21, 2015	7ARG05	7.80
Gloria is excited to participate in jury duty while Jay struggles in order to help Joe's preschool teacher. Phil tags along with Manny and Luke's class for a community service day, while "Take your daughter to work day" allows Claire to introduce her daughters to the professional world. Mitchell and Cameron both want to invite their respective friends to a party and ask Gloria for help.
150	6	"The More You Ignore Me"	Gail Mancuso	Vali Chandrasekaran	November 11, 2015	7ARG06	8.15
Phil and Claire begin to experience their teenagers' bad sides when Luke gets arrested for driving without a license, while Alex sneaks out of a liquor store. Phil is really mad at Luke and is considering punishing him as judge and jury. Cameron helps Gloria recreate and sell a hot sauce which comes from her family. Mitchell helps Jay make a good video to accompany his receiving an award. Andy and Beth cross paths with Dylan and Haley at the movies and Haley and Dylan break up. Phil and Claire discover Alex and Rubén together. Mitchell plans to open his own law firm.
151	7	"Phil's Sexy, Sexy House"	Beth McCarthy-Miller	Stephen Lloyd	November 18, 2015	7ARG08	8.38
Thanksgiving is here and Phil is helping Mitchell and Cameron's friend sell his sexy and sleek house. Each member gets the bright idea of having some 'fun' time by sneaking into the new house. Unbeknownst to each other, they choose the same day and the same time which leads to some hilarious confusion. Meanwhile, at Jay and Gloria's, a surprise plan for the whole family turns into a disaster as Jay further surprises Gloria, who, in turn, surprises him. After everyone has left, Haley says goodbye to Andy at the sleek house and closes the door. She gives into her feelings for Andy and runs back to him and they share a passionate kiss.
152	8	"Clean Out Your Junk Drawer"	Steven Levitan	Steven Levitan	December 2, 2015	7ARG07	7.35
Gloria wins a bid at an auction for a seminar with famed doctor and author Debra Radcliffe, who wrote a self-help book titled "Clean Out Your Junk Drawer." Jay, Claire, and Mitchell unwillingly participate with Gloria, Phil, and Cameron to sort through their emotional junk and it becomes something of a competition between the couples. Elsewhere, Haley meets up with Alex and confesses about the incident with Andy.
153	9	"White Christmas"	Gail Mancuso	Andy Gordon & Jon Pollack	December 9, 2015	7ARG11	8.20
Gloria rents a cabin in the mountains for the whole family to celebrate the holiday. However, unexpected incidents affects their holiday. Mitchell and Cameron are determined to make up for their bad caroling performance from last year. Haley and Andy cannot keep their hands off each other and Jay has a huge announcement to make that catches Claire off guard.
154	10	"Playdates"	Claire Scanlon	Jeffrey Richman	January 6, 2016	7ARG09	8.35
Claire tries to make Phil force a couple, with whom they are friends, to pay for dinner as they never offer to do so. Jay is surprised when the couple with whose child Joe has a playdate supposedly has a lot in common with him and Gloria, particularly their age difference. Mitchell cashes in a birthday coupon from Haley, Alex, and Luke, so they scramble and host an impromptu tour of celebrity homes. Lily has her first crush.
155	11	"Spread Your Wings"	James Bagdonas	Vanessa McCarthy & Ryan Walls	January 13, 2016	7ARG10	8.17
Claire, Luke, and Haley try to free the ducks while Phil visits Alex at Caltech. Jay and Mitchell are in charge of Lily's first sleep-over with her Vietnamese dance troupe. Manny helps Gloria and Cameron with their hot sauce project.
156	12	"Clean for a Day"	Beth McCarthy-Miller	Paul Corrigan & Brad Walsh	February 10, 2016	7ARG13	7.80
Before taking over Jay's closet business, Claire decides to get the house in order by forcing the family to part with unused items, while Alex gets emotional after finding Sanjay's sweatshirt. Cameron worries when Jay finds a new hobby piloting planes. Gloria is taught golf from Mitchell in order to connect with Jay.
157	13	"Thunk in the Trunk"	Phil Traill	Elaine Ko	February 17, 2016	7ARG12	7.48
Claire's new position makes Phil feel like a housewife. Gloria's provocative sauce ad gets Jay jealous. Mitchell and Cameron rent out the apartment above their own, but end up spying on their guests.
158	14	"The Storm"	Jim Bagdonas	Danny Zuker	February 24, 2016	7ARG16	8.10
A thunderstorm brings everyone to Jay and Gloria's, from where Jay tries his best to leave to meet his Navy friends at a pub. Phil tries to be a hero and redeem himself from an embarrassing scene while Mitchell and Cameron try to salvage Lily's birthday party. Haley and Andy struggle with their relationship.
159	15	"I Don't Know How She Does It"	Ryan Case	Jeffrey Richman	March 2, 2016	7ARG14	8.22
Claire impresses her family when she turns into super-mom, both working and doing everything at home, leading to suspicion from Phil. Jay and Gloria go to great lengths to not get caught doing things they should not be doing and Mitchell and Cameron are treated like second-class guests at their friends' wedding.
160	16	"The Cover-Up"	Jim Hensz	Chuck Tatham	March 16, 2016	7ARG15	8.14
Phil and Claire try to hide innocent flirtations with a real estate client and yoga instructor, respectively, from one another. Meanwhile, Jay's new hobby of starring in his own web-series, "Jay Talking," is met with criticism from an online troll. Elsewhere, Mitchell and Cameron attempt to teach Lily how to ride a bike, resulting in both a broken arm and a head injury for Cameron.
161	17	"Express Yourself"	Alisa Statman	Abraham Higginbotham	March 23, 2016	7ARG18	7.69
After deciding to take a spontaneous trip to Paris, Phil and Claire stay up all night to adjust their bodies to the time change. Meanwhile, Cameron’s scorned sister, Pam, comes to stay with the family, much to Mitchell’s chagrin. Elsewhere, Gloria and Manny find themselves in a predicament when they inadvertently tamper with Jay’s remodel of the master bathroom.
162	18	"The Party"	Steven Levitan	Vali Chandrasekaran	April 6, 2016	7ARG17	7.51
Manny and Luke babysit Lily so the adults in the family can have some fun, which includes Phil and Mitchell seeing a movie, Claire and Gloria going to a spa, and Jay and Cameron hitting a sports bar to watch a big fight, but Claire suspects the boys are throwing a party.
163	19	"Man Shouldn't Lie"	Gail Mancuso	Andy Gordon	April 13, 2016	7ARG19	7.44
Claire and the kids hide a stray dog from Phil; even though Jay says he doesn't want new friends, Gloria invites a new couple over; Cameron rents out the upstairs apartment to a Christian rock band.
164	20	"Promposal"	Ken Whittingham	Stephen Lloyd	May 4, 2016	7ARG20	7.42
Claire is convinced there's a mole in the company; Phil confronts Auntie Alice about stealing Gloria's hot sauce recipe; Jay teaches Joe how to be a handyman.
165	21	"Crazy Train"	Jim Hensz	Jon Pollack & Ryan Walls	May 11, 2016	7ARG21	7.16
Manny talks the family into taking the train to attend Dede's wedding in Portland; Claire and Mitchell work on a toast; Phil and Cam are excited to spot their favorite author on the train; Jay's comments about Dede are overheard putting the wedding in jeopardy.
166	22	"Double Click"	Jim Bagdonas	Elaine Ko	May 18, 2016	7ARG22	6.79
Claire struggles to find the right time to fire an employee; Phil thinks he caught Luke with a girl; Alex comes home for the summer, a fact forgotten by everyone; Haley finds out that Andy has a job opportunity to move back to Utah; Jay refuses to believe it might be difficult to reenter the workforce.

== Reception ==
The seventh season received mixed reviews from critics. Kyle Fowle from The A.V. Club gave half of the season's episodes a B− or less. The middle third of the season was more warmly received, especially the episodes "Playdates," "Spread Your Wings," and "Clean for a Day." The three episodes received a B+, A- and B+, respectively.

== Ratings ==
Viewership and ratings per episode of Modern Family season 7
No.	Title	Air date	Rating/share (18–49)	Viewers (millions)	DVR (18–49)	DVR viewers (millions)	Total (18–49)	Total viewers (millions)
1	"Summer Lovin'"	September 23, 2015	3.2/10 (9)	9.46 (22)	2.2	4.81	5.4	14.28
2	"The Day Alex Left for College"	September 30, 2015	3.0/9 (9)	8.72 (23)	1.9	4.34	4.9	13.06
3	"The Closet Case"	October 7, 2015	2.7/8 (8)	7.99 (25)	1.9	4.41	4.6	12.4
4	"She Crazy"	October 14, 2015	2.7/8 (7)	7.88 (23)	2	4.37	4.7	12.25
5	"The Verdict"	October 21, 2015	2.7/8 (10)	7.80 (28)	1.9	4.36	4.6	12.16
6	"The More You Ignore Me"	November 11, 2015	2.7/8 (8)	8.15 (21)	2	4.26	4.7	12.41
7	"Phil's Sexy, Sexy House"	November 18, 2015	2.8/9 (8)	8.38 (20)	2	4.34	4.8	12.72
8	"Clean Out Your Junk Drawer"	December 2, 2015	2.4/7 (11)	7.35 (24)	1.8	4.31	4.2	11.66
9	"White Christmas"	December 9, 2015	2.6/8 (7)	8.20 (22)	1.7	3.99	4.3	12.19
10	"Playdates"	January 6, 2016	2.8/9 (6)	8.35 (19)	1.9	4.41	4.7	12.76
11	"Spread Your Wings"	January 13, 2016	2.7/8 (4)	8.17 (17)	1.9	4.36	4.6	12.54
12	"Clean for a Day"	February 10, 2016	2.6/8 (2)	7.80 (23)	1.9	4.45	4.5	12.26
13	"Thunk in the Trunk"	February 17, 2016	2.4/8 (3)	7.48 (18)	1.8	4.07	4.2	11.58
14	"The Storm"	February 24, 2016	2.5/8 (6)	8.10 (18)	1.8	3.94	4.3	12.05
15	"I Don't Know How She Does It"	March 2, 2016	2.6/8 (3)	8.22 (13)	1.7	3.87	4.3	12.09
16	"The Cover-Up"	March 16, 2016	2.5/9 (6)	8.14 (16)	1.9	4.23	4.4	12.37
17	"Express Yourself"	March 23, 2016	2.4/8 (5)	7.69 (18)	1.8	4.42	4.3	12.15
18	"The Party"	April 6, 2016	2.3/7 (5)	7.51 (17)	1.8	4.22	4.1	11.75
19	"Man Shouldn't Lie"	April 13, 2016	2.2/7 (4)	7.44 (25)	1.8	4.2	4	11.64
20	"Promposal"	May 4, 2016	2.2/8 (3)	7.42 (22)	1.9	4.04	4.1	11.45
21	"Crazy Train"	May 11, 2016	2.1/7 (4)	7.16 (22)	1.9	4.19	4	11.35
22	"Double Click"	May 18, 2016	2.1/7	6.79	1.7	4.12	3.8	10.91

== DVD release ==
Modern Family: The Complete Seventh Season
Set Details		Special Features
22 episodes (1 extended); 3-disc set; 1.78:1 aspect ratio; English (Dolby Digital 5.1); Subtitles: English, Spanish and French; Runtime: 499 minutes		Extended Episode: "Thunk in the Trunk"; Storming the Set: The making of the episode "The Storm"; Growing Up Modern Family; Kids in the Spotlight; Deleted and Alternate Scenes
Release Dates
Region 1	Region 2	Region 4
September 20, 2016	September 5, 2016	October 11, 2016
