= Roo Powell =

American writer and advocate

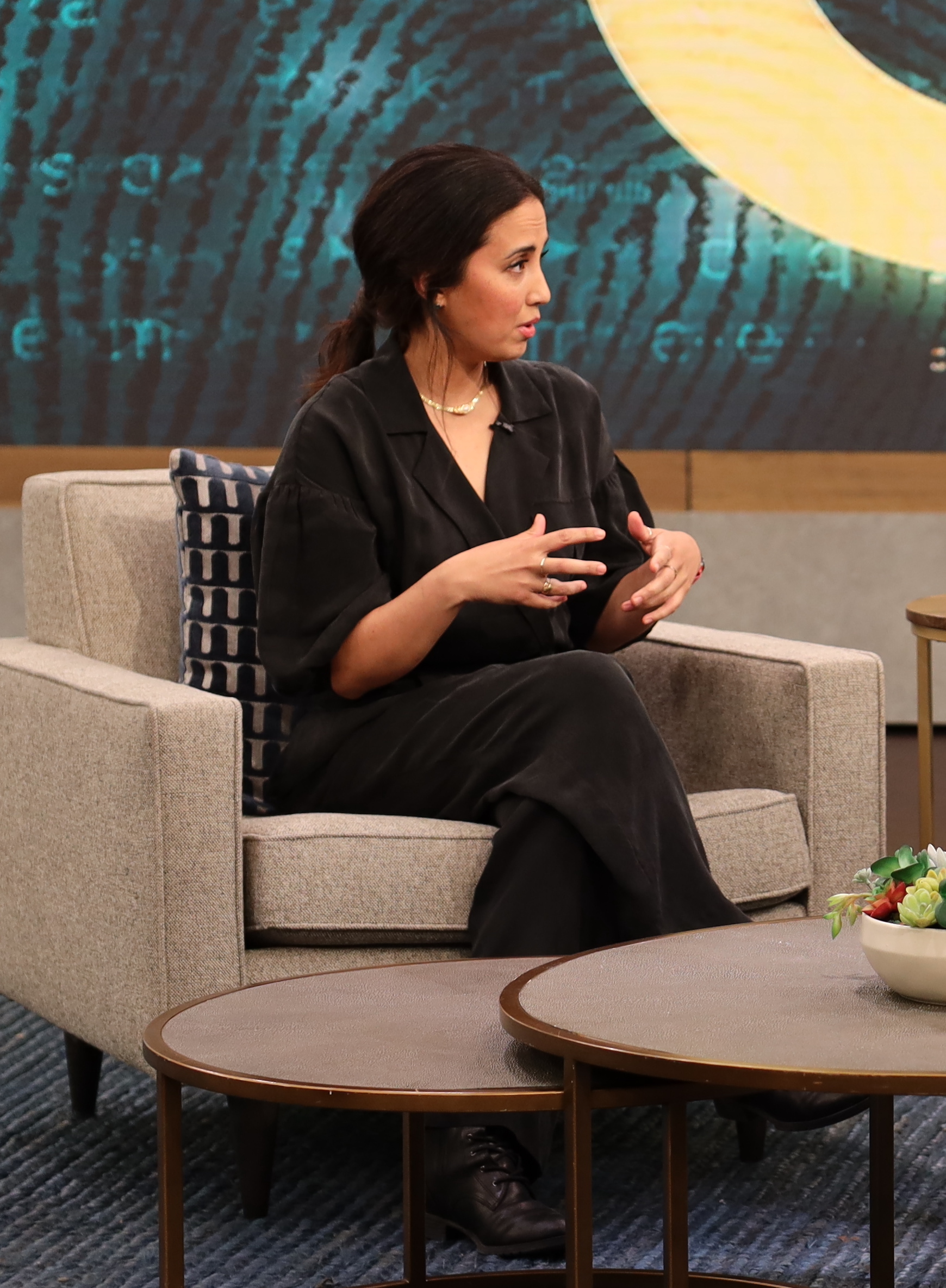
Powell speaks about Undercover Underage in 2021

Roo Powell is an American writer and advocate. Powell was born in Hong Kong. Her mother is from the Philippines and her father is from Wales.

Powell began writing online in 2010, which led to larger writing and branding projects as well as speaking engagements. Powell has worked in the technology industry since 2017, running creative for and advising companies that use artificial intelligence to analyze and detect toxic behavior online. Powell previously served as an advisor to Spectrum Labs, an artificial intelligence company that develops technology to detect toxic and abusive behavior online.

Powell is the founder of SOSA — Safe from Online Sex Abuse, a nonprofit organization that works to combat online child sexual exploitation and collaborates with law enforcement. In October 2021, it was announced that Powell and SOSA would be featured in a six-part docuseries, Undercover Underage, which debuted in November 2021 on Discovery+ and made its linear broadcast premiere in February 2022. Season 2 of Undercover Underage premiered on May 1, 2023.

In 2025, SOSA Undercover, created by the same producers of Undercover Underage premiered on YouTube.

In March 2026, Predator Files, an international broadcast version of SOSA Undercover, premiered on Crime+Investigation in the United Kingdom.
