= The Party (Modern Family) =

- Modern Family episode
- Episode no.: Season 7 Episode 18
- Directed by: Steven Levitan
- Written by: Vali Chandrasekaran
- Production code: 7ARG17
- Original air date: April 6, 2016

Episode chronology
← Previous "Express Yourself"	Next → "Man Shouldn't Lie"
- Modern Family season 7

"The Party" is the eighteenth episode of the seventh season and the 162nd episode overall of the American sitcom Modern Family. It aired on April 6, 2016 on American Broadcasting Company (ABC). The episode is directed by Steven Levitan and written by Vali Chandrasekaran.

== Plot ==
Claire and Gloria are going away for a spa weekend after Claire finished a big job for said spa; Phil and Mitchell are going to see a movie while Jay and Cameron are going to a sports bar together to watch a boxing match, leaving Manny and Luke to babysit Lily at the Dunphy's house.

At the spa, Claire's phone alerts her that the smoke alarm was set off. This worries her, and she tries to phone Luke but can't get through; but Gloria reaches Manny who tells her that they burnt chocolate chip cookies baking them. Claire calls their bluff as her oven is broken, and despite Gloria's reassurance that everything is fine, Claire decides to head home anyways, making Gloria leave as well.

Meanwhile, Phil and Mitchell wait in the line to the movie when a client to whom Phil sold a house comes up to them and offers them two gummy bears laced with pot. Neither of the two have done pot, and are excited to experience it for the first time; they are told that the marijuana will take effect after 45 minutes post-ingestion. No sooner has Phil timed his clock for 45 minutes when the smoke alert comes through. When he also can't get through to Luke, he and Mitchell decide to rush home to check and get back in time to enjoy their movie without anyone noticing.

At first, Jay and Cameron awkwardly try to make small talk unsuccessfully; but their mutual disagreements with two other people in the bar soon bonds them by making them place bets and playing games for money against the aforementioned duo.

Arriving home, Claire and Gloria find Manny painting a portrait of Luke and nothing else, and Luke explains they were actually making chocolate chip pancakes that burnt and set off the alarm. Claire still holds her suspicions, and they are cemented even more when she finds a red solo cup tainted with the smell of alcohol. At the same time, Phil and Mitchell arrive home and Claire orders them to search the house. While checking the basement, the pot kicks in for Phil and Mitchell and they struggle to maintain their composure. When Phil and Mitchell discovers the partygoers in Luke's room, he and Mitchell decide not to tell the truth since otherwise, they will have to miss the movie and Claire will find out that they are high.

While they were doing that, Claire convinces Luke and Manny to turn on each other to no avail. Just then, she hears what she interprets as the sound of a party; when she goes outside to check, Claire and Gloria find Jay and Cameron playing table tennis against the guys they met in the bar. Claire almost gives up when a partygoer falls out of the window, crashing into the tennis table and the party is exposed. The parents then call Luke and Manny in to be punished, while Phil and Mitchell's secret gets out. The episode ends with Lily being forced to run on a treadmill to try and wear her out from her sugar high she got from Luke and Manny's soda bribe in return for her keeping the party a secret.

== Reception ==
=== Broadcasting ===
The episode was watched by 7.51 million people, down 0.18 from the previous episode.
