= The Day Alex Left for College =

- Modern Family episode
- Episode no.: Season 7 Episode 2
- Directed by: Jeffrey Walker
- Written by: Danny Zuker
- Production code: 7ARG02
- Original air date: September 30, 2015

Guest appearances
- Chloe Csengery as Maisie; Kendall Ryan Sanders as Will; Brittani Ebert as Debbie; Rebecca Avery as Denise; David Shatraw as Dennis

Episode chronology
← Previous "Summer Lovin’"	Next → "The Closet Case"
- Modern Family season 7

"The Day Alex Left for College" is the second episode of the seventh season and the 146th episode overall of the American sitcom Modern Family. Aired on September 30, 2015 on American Broadcasting Company (ABC), the episode was directed by Jeffrey Walker and written by Danny Zuker.

== Plot ==
Alex (Ariel Winter) is ready to start her first day as a college student, and leaves home for Caltech a day early, with only Haley (Sarah Hyland) going with her. While moving in, Alex meets her new roommate, Maisie, who is replacing her original foreign roommate and with whom Alex does not get along with as she finds her loud and boisterous. The sisters share a tender moment when Haley explains to her that college is a big adjustment, and that there is nothing wrong with having a personal cheerleader, making Alex reconsider her decision as she realizes that her sister is looking out for her.

Elsewhere, Phil (Ty Burrell) asks Luke (Nolan Gould) to follow him to sell a house that is unsellable. However, Luke is uninterested in the house as he would rather hang out with his friends. Despite the fact that he wants his son to help him finish the sale, Phil finally agrees to let him go. But that night, Luke asks his dad to help him build a village for the duck eggs that the pair found on the road earlier that day.

Claire (Julie Bowen) and the Pritchetts have to go to Lily’s (Aubrey Anderson-Emmons) first soccer game, though no one wants to. While thinking of an excuse, Gloria (Sofía Vergara) suggests that Jay (Ed O'Neill) could be injured and shoots him in the left foot with Manny’s BB gun to make it realistic. When they arrive, Mitchell (Jesse Tyler Ferguson), who has become the coach, initially believes them until Joe (Jeremy Maguire) spills the beans. Meanwhile, Cameron (Eric Stonestreet) helps Mitchell to be a good coach from afar when the referee asks him to leave the game after the couple fought over the rented apartment upstairs. Mitchell temporarily loses his position as coach due to his shaky coaching, but manages to get it back thanks to Cam’s encouragement and Lily wins her game.

At the end of this episode, the family makes a pact to be able to skip a child’s event once a year without consequence, much to Manny's (Rico Rodriguez) disappointment as nobody wants to see his theater performance.

== Reception ==
=== Broadcasting ===
The episode was watched by 8.72 million people, down 0.74 from the previous episode.

=== Reviews ===
The episode received positive reviews. Joshua Alston of The A.V. Club praised the episode, despite the recycled plots, awarding it a B grade. He found that as the episode goes on, "the funnier and more charming it gets, and the final act brings the episode to a satisfying and elegant conclusion." Liz Estey of TV Fanatic gave the episode a 4/5, calling Haley and Alex's moments "incredibly poignant", praising the episode for doing "a wonderful job of showing Phil's resistance and eventual acceptance of Luke's new independence", and calling Mitchell and Cam's rapport "very fun to watch". Zachary Anderson of Out Loud Culture gave the episode 8.5/10, calling it "refreshing" because of the way it handled Alex going off to college and called it "an excellent transition into a new era for the clan", though he believed that Cam and Mitch's storyline "felt too isolated".

Hunter Vogt of The TV Ratings Guide praised the episode, pointing to funny moments such as the contrast between Claire and Phil being emotional while Alex is not, and when Mitch and Cam called everyone's phones. However, he believed that Phil and Luke's storyline "was not interesting" and that the third act "wasn't as strong as the first two-thirds of the episode." Lisa Fernandez of Next Projection thought that it was a "lovely episode" and an improvement of the previous week's episode, and gave it a score of 6.5/10. She said that "what works really works", and praises the Dunphy storylines, but goes on to criticize the storyline that employs Gloria, Jay, Cam, and Mitch, calling it a "hectic mess" that is "pointless in the extreme" and "could have used a rewrite. A good, full rewrite."
