= Spread Your Wings (Modern Family) =

- Modern Family episode
- Episode no.: Season 7 Episode 11
- Directed by: James Bagdonas
- Written by: Vanessa McCarthy; Ryan Walls
- Production code: 7ARG10
- Original air date: January 13, 2016

Guest appearances
- Michelle Panu as Sarah; Janet Song as Mrs Tran; Victoria Oscar as Tourist

Episode chronology
← Previous "Playdates"	Next → "Clean for a Day"
- Modern Family season 7

"Spread Your Wings" is the eleventh episode of the seventh season and the 155th episode overall of the American sitcom Modern Family. It aired on January 13, 2016 on American Broadcasting Company (ABC). The episode is directed by James Bagdonas and written by Vanessa McCarthy and Ryan Walls.

== Plot ==
Alex (Ariel Winter) welcomes Phil (Ty Burrell) for the first time since she enrolled in Caltech. While Phil is absent, Claire (Julie Bowen), Haley (Sarah Hyland), and Luke (Nolan Gould) decide to get rid of the three ducks they have in their house, since the ducks are a hassle to have around. But Claire changes her mind after she realizes how much the ducks remind Phil of their own children. Phil has a similar experience while visiting Alex, when she tells him that she does not want to participate in a freshman ritual that she views as frivolous. Phil realizes he is trying to impose his own college experience on his daughter, and apologizes. At the same time, he brings Alex the clothes needed in order for her to participate, which she does. By the time Haley, Luke and Claire come home, Phil has also a change of heart about keeping his children to himself, and helps them to release the ducks.

Manny (Rico Rodriguez) recruits Gloria (Sofía Vergara) and Cameron (Eric Stonestreet) on a heist to steal blood peppers to make their hot sauce. By suggesting and planning the heist, he also wants to prove to his mother that he can be a rebel, not just a goody-two-shoes boy that other people see him as. His plan works, but Cameron behaves selfishly by making decisions about Gloria’s sauce business without Gloria’s knowledge. Gloria puts her foot down, and eventually manages to convince Cam to create his own sauce without leeching off anyone.

Meanwhile, Jay (Ed O'Neill) helps Mitchell (Jesse Tyler Ferguson) to organize Lily’s (Aubrey Anderson-Emmons) first sleepover with her friends from a Vietnamese dance troupe, a difficult feat since Mitchell and Cameron aren't always welcomed by the Vietnamese parents. Mitchell decides at first to be the “cool daddy” who allows the girls to do whatever they want, but after being unable to take it, he reaches out to Jay to help him make the girls as exhausted as possible. Mitchell and Jay then get Cameron and Gloria to make the girls bottle some hot sauce, much to a parent’s displeasure. At the end of the day, Jay succeeds in his sleepover mission as every girl—and Mitchell—falls asleep by 7:45 PM.

== Reception ==
Kyle Fowle of The A.V. Club gave the episode an A−.
