= SOSA =

American nonprofit organization

SOSA (Safe from Online Sex Abuse) is a nonprofit organization that combats online child sexual abuse and human trafficking through undercover operations with law enforcement, advocacy, and education. Roo Powell started SOSA in 2020. SOSA works directly with Internet Crimes Against Children Task Force detectives and prosecutors. SOSA raises awareness about abuse tactics, trains law enforcement, advises on legislation, and supports survivors by connecting them with resources.

Their undercover work was the subject of Investigation Discovery docuseries Undercover Underage for two seasons. After the show was not renewed, they launched their own show, SOSA Undercover, on YouTube.
