= Wayback Machine (Peabody's Improbable History) =

Fictional time machine

Sherman (left) and Mr. Peabody (right) enter the Wayback Machine ca. 1960 to witness another time and place in history.

The Wayback Machine or WABAC Machine is a fictional time machine and plot device from the 1960s American cartoon television series The Adventures of Rocky and Bullwinkle and Friends. Each episode of the cartoon series included a short segment "Peabody's Improbable History" in which the Wayback Machine was used by the segment's main characters, Mr. Peabody and Sherman, to travel back in time to visit important events in human history. The term has acquired popular or idiomatic usage as a way to introduce events or things from the past.

The Wayback Machine of the Internet Archive was named after the Wayback Machine from the Rocky and Bullwinkle cartoon.

== Peabody's Improbable History ==
The Adventures of Rocky and Bullwinkle and Friends was an American television cartoon series from the 1960s. Each half-hour cartoon episode included a short segment called "Peabody's Improbable History", with main characters Mr. Peabody, a genius, polymath, and bow tie-wearing beagle, and Sherman, his adopted pet boy. The segment was conceived and created by Ted Key. In each episode Mr. Peabody and Sherman would use their Wayback Machine to travel back in time to visit important historical events. The machine was invented by Mr. Peabody as a birthday gift for Sherman. By enabling them to visit famous historical people or events, the Wayback provided educational adventures for Sherman.

At the beginning of the cartoon segment, at the request of Mr. Peabody ("Sherman, set the Wayback machine to..."), Sherman would set the Wayback controls to a time and place of historical importance; by walking through a door in the Wayback machine, they would be instantly transported there. Examples of people or historical situations visited are the Marquess of Queensberry and the rules of boxing, the imprisonment and memoirs of Casanova, Jim Bowie and the Bowie knife, and the "Charge of the Light Brigade". During such visits, the historical figures and situations encountered are always distorted in some crucial way. The main focus of Mr. Peabody and Sherman's adventures is thus the restoration of historical events to their proper course, albeit in a characteristically frivolous and anachronistic way. The machine apparently later returned Mr. Peabody and Sherman to the present, although the return trip was never shown. The segment traditionally ended with a bad pun.

Either of the names Wayback or WABAC are in common usage, with the term "WAYBACK" explicitly indicated during the segment in which Mr. Peabody and Sherman visit the "Charge of the Light Brigade". The precise meaning of the acronym WABAC is unknown. According to Gerard Baldwin, one of the show's directors, the name "WABAC" is a reference to the UNIVAC I. Mid-century, large-sized computers often had names that ended in "AC" (generally for "Automatic/Analogue Computer" or similar), such as ENIAC or UNIVAC. The term "Wayback" suggests the idomatic expression "way back [in some former time]".

== Adopted as an idiom by popular use ==
The concept or term "Wayback machine" has been adopted in popular usage as a convenient way to introduce issues or events of the past, often employing the original line "Sherman, set the Wayback machine to...". For example, this introduction was used by the character Kevin Flynn in the film Tron. Another example occurred in a 1995 episode of the television show NewsRadio in which station owner Jimmy James (Stephen Root) says: "Dave, don't mess with a man with a Wayback Machine. I can make it so you were never born". As in the original cartoon, the Wayback Machine is invoked to suggest the audience follow the narrator back to the past. Frequently, such visits to the past are trips of nostalgia, remembering times, places, or things of the not-so-distant past.

The Wayback Machine of the Internet Archive, a digital archive of all past web pages of the internet, was named after Peabody and Sherman's Wayback. With it, users can revisit web pages that have existed at any period in the past.

== Mr. Peabody and Sherman film (2014) ==
An animated film based on the original Rocky and Bullwinkle cartoon entitled Mr. Peabody & Sherman was released by the movie studio DreamWorks Animation on March 7, 2014. The WABAC machine was a central element to the plot. In the movie, the acronym WABAC was revealed to stand for Wavelength Acceleration Bidirectional Asynchronous Controller.
