= Ariel Winter =

American actress (born 1998)

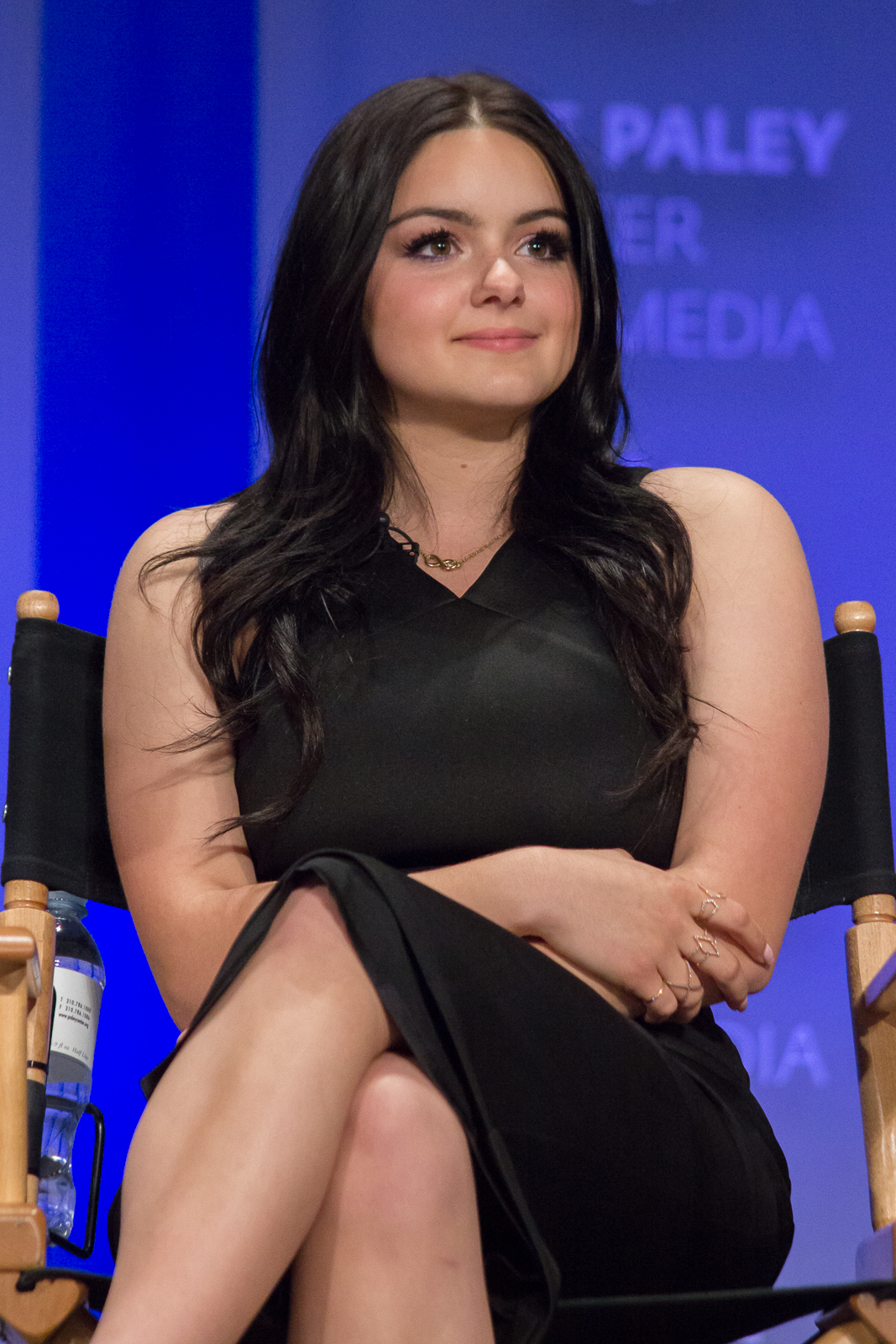
- Winter in 2015
- Born: Ariel Winter Workman; January 28, 1998 (age 28); Fairfax, Virginia, U.S.
- Occupation: Actress
- Years active: 2002–present
- Known for: Alex Dunphy in Modern Family Princess Sofia in Sofia the First
- Partner(s): Levi Meaden (2016–2019); Luke Benward (2020–2025)
- Relatives: Shanelle Workman (sister); Jimmy Workman (brother)
- Awards: Full list

Ariel Winter Workman (born January 28, 1998) is an American actress. She gained her career breakthrough and stardom in the 2010s for playing the intelligent and nerdy Alex Dunphy in the ABC sitcom Modern Family (2009–2020), for which she and her several costars won the Screen Actors Guild Award for Outstanding Performance by an Ensemble in a Comedy Series four consecutive times from 2010 to 2013.

Winter made her film debut in Kiss Kiss Bang Bang (2005) at the age of seven, followed by roles in the films Speed Racer (2008), The Chaperone (2011), Safelight (2015), and The Last Movie Star (2017). She also voiced roles in the animated films Horton Hears a Who! (2008), ParaNorman (2012), Mr. Peabody & Sherman (2014), and Smurfs: The Lost Village (2017); and voiced Carrie Kelley / Robin in the two-part animated film Batman: The Dark Knight Returns (2012–2013).

== Early life ==
Ariel Winter Workman was born on January 28, 1998, in Fairfax, Virginia. She is the daughter of Chrisoula (née Batistas) and Glenn Workman. Through her mother, she is of Greek descent, and through her father, of German descent. She is the younger sister of actors Shanelle Workman and Jimmy Workman.

== Career ==
Winter obtained her first entertainment industry job in a Cool Whip commercial advertisement in 2002 when she was four years old. She had her first television role in an episode of Listen Up, and followed it with appearances in a variety of television shows such as Freddie, Monk, Bones, and ER. She also lent her voice to characters in two animated films - Disney's Bambi II and Blue Sky's Ice Age: The Meltdown.

She voiced the character of Gretchen in the animated Disney Channel series Phineas and Ferb before being cast in the regular role of Alex Dunphy in the ABC series Modern Family, which premiered in 2009 and ended in 2020. She has continued to work in TV animation, including providing the voice of Marina on Disney Junior's Jake and the Never Land Pirates. In 2012, Winter was cast as the voice of Sofia, the lead character in the Disney animated franchise Sofia the First.

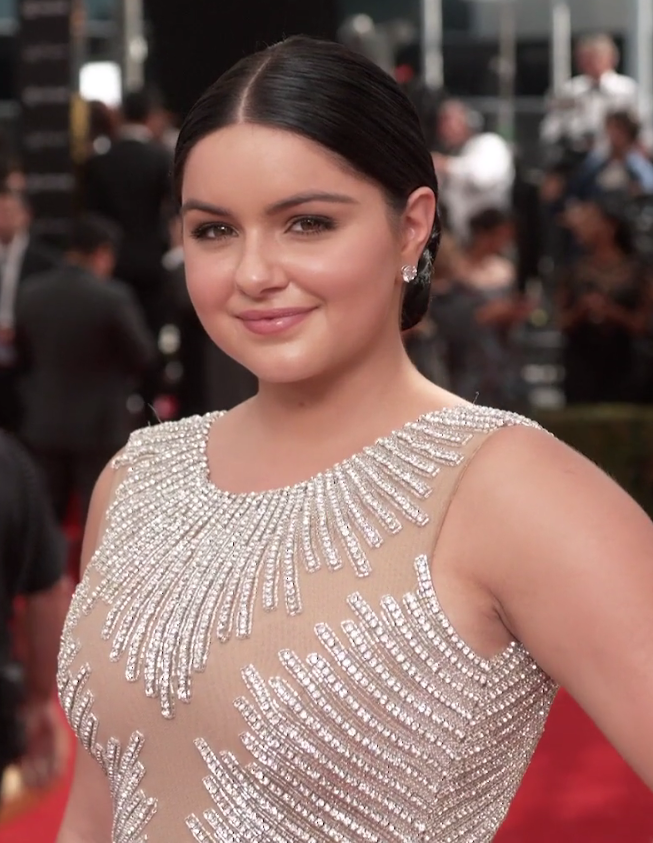
Winter at the 68th Primetime Emmy Awards in 2016

In 2014, she voiced Penny Peterson, Sherman's adversary-turned-friend in the DreamWorks Animation film Mr. Peabody and Sherman.

Winter has appeared in feature films, most notably in Kiss Kiss Bang Bang, Speed Racer, Duress, and Opposite Day. She also appeared on the Halloween-themed TV film Fred 2: Night of the Living Fred. For her leading role in the film The Chaperone, she was nominated at the Young Artist Awards 2012 as "Best Actress in a Motion Picture".

In 2026, Winter portrayed Cognita in Clash of the Thundermans.

== Activism ==
As of 2025, she volunteers at SOSA as a decoy in sting operations against child sexual predators. She is an advocate against childhood abuse, citing growing up in the entertainment industry as a source of passion against exploitation.

== Personal life ==
In 2012, Winter's sister Shanelle Workman filed to become her guardian, alleging that their mother had been physically and emotionally abusive. In 2014, the court awarded guardianship to Shanelle Workman and permanently removed Winter from her mother's guardianship. Their mother later released a statement saying that "the family has moved beyond the conflict". In 2015, when she was 17 years old, Winter declared on Twitter that she was officially emancipated.

She is a purple belt in taekwondo.

In 2015, Winter underwent breast reduction surgery. In a 2016 interview with Nightline, Winter explained the awkwardness of developing at 12 years old in the public eye, combined with the back pain that rendered her unable to stand up straight at times, was "really ostracizing and excruciatingly painful." Describing the improvement that the surgery had on her both physically and psychologically, she told Glamour magazine that it was "amazing to finally feel right. This is how I was supposed to be." At the 2016 Screen Actors Guild Awards, Winter gained media attention for wearing a Romona Kaveza gown that revealed her surgical scars. She was shocked after walking down the red carpet to see the photos the next day and "every headline be about my cleavage and -- not about my talent." Winter later tweeted, "Guys there is a reason I didn't make an effort to cover up my scars! They are part of me and I'm not ashamed of them at all."

Winter attended Campbell Hall School in Los Angeles, graduating in June 2016. She was accepted to University of California, Los Angeles (UCLA) and scheduled to begin there in the fall quarter of 2016. However, she later confirmed that she planned to attend UCLA in fall 2017. On her decision to attend college, she explained, "You gotta have something else you can do. I've always been interested in law, so I think it'll definitely be something that I'll love to do and also go to school for." In 2018, Winter took an indefinite hiatus from UCLA to focus on her work.

Winter is a member of the Greek Orthodox Church.

She dated Canadian actor Levi Meaden for three years; they split in 2019. The couple lived together in Winter's 3,200-square-foot (300 m^{2}) home in Sherman Oaks, Los Angeles. From 2020 to August 2025, she was in a relationship with actor Luke Benward. In 2022, Winter moved from Southern California to Nashville, Tennessee.

== Filmography ==
=== Film ===
Year	Title	Role	Notes
2005	Kiss Kiss Bang Bang	Young Harmony Faith Lane	
2006	Curious George	Kid (voice)	
2006	Bambi II	Thumper's Sister (voice)	
2006	Ice Age: The Meltdown	Various characters (voice)	
2008	One Missed Call	Ellie Layton	
2008	Speed Racer	Young Trixie	
2008	Horton Hears a Who!	Various characters (voice)	
2009	Tales from the Catholic Church of Elvis!	Little Girl	
2009	Final Fantasy VII: Advent Children Complete	Marlene Wallace (voice)	
2009	Life Is Hot in Cracktown	Suzie	
2009	Duress	Sarah Barnett	
2009	Opposite Day	Carla Benson	
2009	Cloudy with a Chance of Meatballs	Various characters (voice)	
2009	Afro Samurai: Resurrection	Young Sio (voice)	
2010	Killers	Sadie	
2010	Nic & Tristan Go Mega Dega	Lisa	
2010	DC Showcase: Green Arrow	Princess Perdita (voice)	
2011	The Chaperone	Sally	
2011	Phineas and Ferb the Movie: Across the 2nd Dimension	Gretchen (voice)	
2011	Fred 2: Night of the Living Fred	Talia	
2012	Excision	Grace	
2012	The Misadventures of the Dunderheads	Ella (age 9)	
2012	Tad, The Lost Explorer	Sarah Lavrof (voice)	
2012	ParaNorman	Blithe Hollow Kid (voice)	
2012	Dear Dracula	Emma (voice)	
2012	Sofia the First: Once Upon a Princess	Sofia (voice)	Television film
2012–2013	Batman: The Dark Knight Returns	Carrie Kelley / Robin (voice)	Direct-to-video
2013	Dora the Explorer and the Destiny Medallion	Dora	Short film
2013	Scooby-Doo! Stage Fright	Chrissy Damon (voice)	Direct-to-video
2013	Sofia the First: The Floating Palace	Sofia (voice)	Television film
2013	Tad, The Lost Explorer	Sara Lavrof	
2014	Mr. Peabody & Sherman	Penny Peterson (voice)	
2015	Safelight	Kate	
2016	Elena and the Secret of Avalor	Sofia (voice)	Television film
2017	Smurfs: The Lost Village	Smurf Lily (voice)	
2017	The Last Movie Star	Lil McDougal	
2025	Like Father Like Son	Hailey	
2025	Don't Log Off	Annie	Limited theater release, then released direct-to-demand, co-produced
2025	Pools	Delaney	

=== Television ===
Year	Title	Role	Notes
2005	Listen Up	Little Girl	Episode: "Last Vegas"
2005	Tickle-U	Pipoca (voice)	
2005	Freddie	Hobo	Episode: "Halloween"
2006	Monk	Donna Cain	Episode: "Mr. Monk and the Astronaut"
2006	So Notorious	Little Tori	5 episodes
2006	Jericho	Julie	Episode: "Pilot"
2006	Bones	Liza	Episode: "The Girl with the Curl"
2006	Nip/Tuck	Kid	Episode: "Reefer"
2007	Crossing Jordan	Gwen	Episode: "Faith"
2007	Shorty McShorts' Shorts	Taffy (voice)	Episode: "Flip-Flopped"
2007	Criminal Minds	Katie Jacobs	Episode: "Seven Seconds"
2008	Ghost Whisperer	Natalie	Episode: "Imaginary Friends and Enemies"
2008–2015, 2025	Phineas and Ferb	Gretchen (voice)	Recurring role
2009	ER	Lucy Moore	5 episodes
2009	The Penguins of Madagascar	Little Girl (voice)	Episode: "What Goes Around / Mask of the Raccoon"
2009–2020	Modern Family	Alex Dunphy	Main role; 216 episodes
2011	WWE Raw	Herself	Guest star (airdate: February 14)
2011	The Haunting Hour: The Series	Jenny	Episode: "Fear Never Knocks"
2011–2015	Jake and the Never Land Pirates	Marina (voice)	22 episodes
2011, 2013	Minnie's Bow-Toons	Roxie Squirrel (voice)	2 episodes
2012	The Haunting Hour: The Series	Gracie	Episode: "Headshot"
2012	Young Justice	Queen Perdita (voice)	Episode: "Coldhearted"
2012–2018	Sofia the First	Sofia (voice)	Main role
2016	Milo Murphy's Law	Jackie (voice)	Episode: "The Wilder West"
2019	Law & Order: Special Victims Unit	Raegan James	Episode: "The Darkest Journey Home"
2019	Robot Chicken	Various characters (voice)	Episode: "Ginger Hill in: Bursting Pipes"
2020	Elena of Avalor	Sofia (voice)	Episode: "Coronation Day"
2023	Stars on Mars	Herself	Contestant
2023	Firebuds	Calamity Train (voice)	Episode: "Annie Spokely"
2023–2024	Star Trek: Lower Decks	D'Erika Tendi (voice)	Recurring role
2025–present	The Sisters Grimm	Sabrina (voice)	Main role
2025–present	SOSA UNDERCOVER	Herself	
2026	Sofia the First: Royal Magic	Sofia (voice)	Main role
2026	Predator Files	Herself	Recurring role
2026	Clash of the Thundermans	Cognita	Television film

=== Video games ===
Year	Title	Role	Notes
2010	Kingdom Hearts Birth by Sleep	Young Kairi	
2012	Final Fantasy XIII-2	Mog	
2012	Guild Wars 2	Cassie	
2014	Kingdom Hearts HD 2.5 Remix	Young Kairi	Archival footage
2015	Final Fantasy Type-0 HD	Moogle	
2020	Kingdom Hearts: Melody of Memory	Young Kairi	Archival footage
2022	The Quarry	Abigail "Abi" Blyg	Voice, motion-capture, and likeness

== Awards and nominations ==
Organizations	Year	Category	Work	Result	Ref.
Screen Actors Guild Awards	2009	Outstanding Ensemble in a Comedy Series (Note: Shared with Ed O'Neill, Sofía Vergara, Julie Bowen, Ty Burrell, Jesse Tyler Ferguson, Eric Stonestreet, Sarah Hyland, Nolan Gould and Rico Rodriguez.)	Modern Family (season one)	Nominated	
Screen Actors Guild Awards	2010	Outstanding Ensemble in a Comedy Series	Modern Family (season two)	Won	
Screen Actors Guild Awards	2011	Outstanding Ensemble in a Comedy Series (Note: Shared with O'Neill, Vergara, Bowen, Burrell, Ferguson, Stonestreet, Hyland, Gould, Rodriguez and Aubrey Anderson-Emmons.)	Modern Family (season three)	Won	
Screen Actors Guild Awards	2012	Outstanding Ensemble in a Comedy Series	Modern Family (season four)	Won	
Screen Actors Guild Awards	2013	Outstanding Ensemble in a Comedy Series	Modern Family (season five)	Won	
Screen Actors Guild Awards	2014	Outstanding Ensemble in a Comedy Series	Modern Family (season six)	Nominated	
Screen Actors Guild Awards	2015	Outstanding Ensemble in a Comedy Series	Modern Family (season seven)	Nominated	
Screen Actors Guild Awards	2016	Outstanding Ensemble in a Comedy Series (Note: Shared with O'Neill, Vergara, Bowen, Burrell, Ferguson, Stonestreet, Hyland, Gould, Rodriguez, Anderson-Emmons and Jeremy Maguire.)	Modern Family (season eight)	Nominated	
Young Artist Awards	2010	Outstanding Young Performers in a TV Series (Note: Shared with Gould and Rodriguez)	Modern Family	Won	
Young Artist Awards	2011	Outstanding Young Ensemble in a TV Series	Modern Family	Nominated	
Young Artist Awards	2012	Best Leading Young Actress in a Feature Film	The Chaperone	Nominated	
