= Fears (Modern Family) =

- Modern Family episode
- Mitchell (Jesse Tyler Ferguson) and Cameron (Eric Stonestreet) when they realize why Lily says "mommy"
- Episode no.: Season 1 Episode 16
- Directed by: Reginald Hudlin
- Written by: Steven Levitan
- Production code: 1ARG18
- Original air date: March 3, 2010

Guest appearances
- Suzy Nakamura as Dr. Miura; Dale E. Turner as Jenkins

Episode chronology
← Previous "My Funky Valentine"	Next → "Truth Be Told"
- Modern Family season 1

"Fears" is the sixteenth episode of the first season of the American family sitcom television series Modern Family and the sixteenth episode of the series overall. It originally aired on ABC on March 3, 2010. The episode was written by co-creator, Steven Levitan and directed by Reginald Hudlin.

In the episode, Phil and Luke decide to search the dark place under their house to discover if there is anything hidden there that worth their attention but they only find some Halloween decorations. Haley finally passes her driver's test on her third attempt and gets her driver's license and Alex decides to go to a dance. Mitchell and Cameron invite Lily's pediatrician for a brunch but they end up doubting their worth as parents when Lily says "mommy" in the pediatrician's presence. Gloria wants to make Jay and Manny face their fear of roller coasters and forces them, in her way, to ride one.

"Fears" received a Nielsen Rating of 3.5/9, received positive reviews from critics, and garnered 8.08 million viewers when it premiered.

== Plot ==
This episode begins with the kids being interviewed as to their fears, a theme which runs through the three family plotlines.

After a cable guy tells Haley (Sarah Hyland) "that's a great collection you've got down there", Phil (Ty Burrell) and Luke (Nolan Gould) do not know what the cable guy is talking about and decide to go into the crawlspace under the house. Phil gives up, because of his fear of the dark - so they send Luke's remote-controlled truck with a camera attached on it to search the area. The car crashes and gets stuck making Luke upset. Luke decides to go under, but gets his belt loop stuck on something. Phil breaks his fear of dark to save Luke and get the truck. The two then decide to go farther but their discovery of some human bones rushed them out of there. They call the police who tell them that the bones are Halloween decorations from the old owner.

Haley tries to get her driver's license for the third time and if she fails she has to wait six months to try again. Claire (Julie Bowen) tries to motivate her, but Haley becomes more nervous when she gets the same examiner. Claire also tries to motivate Alex (Ariel Winter) to go to a dance, because Alex thinks no one will ask her. Claire convinces her to go and that someone will ask her to dance. Haley finally gets her license, but almost loses it when she forgets to put the brake on with the teacher still in the car.

Meanwhile, Mitchell (Jesse Tyler Ferguson) and Cameron (Eric Stonestreet) invite Lily's pediatrician Dr. Miura (Suzy Nakamura) (from "Run for Your Wife" episode) to their house for brunch, to get on her good side. However, it goes badly when Lily says "Mommy" (what they describe as a gay couple's worst nightmare) even though they think she has never heard the word before. Mitchell and Cameron doubt their worth as parents because they believe Lily wants a mother. Dr. Miura assures them that they're great parents and having a mother isn't all its cracked up to be, citing her own strained relationship with her mother while having a strong one with her father. After she leaves, Mitchell and Cameron find that one of Lily's toys says "Mommy" when pressed, which is where she picked up the word, quelling both their fears about the lack of a female parent in Lily's life.

At the Pritchett house, Manny (Rico Rodriguez) is worried about attending a birthday party that has a roller coaster. Gloria (Sofía Vergara), to make Manny face his fear, tells him and Jay (Ed O'Neill) they are going fishing, but actually takes them on a roller coaster. Manny originally says he will go, but changes his mind when Jay refuses. Gloria calls them little girls and gives them her hat and purse and goes to ride the roller coaster alone. This embarrasses the two of them enough into getting them on the roller coaster, where they have a great time and Manny manages to conquer his fear.

== Production ==
The episode is written by Steven Levitan, who co-created the show making it his fourth written episode for the season and directed by Reginald Hudlin. It was originally supposed to air March 3, 2010, but was moved up a week. It was the sixteenth episode produced for the season.

== Reception ==
=== Ratings ===
In its original American broadcast, "Fears" was viewed by 8.08 million viewers getting an 18-49 Nielsen Rating of 3.5/9 15% percent down from the last original episode and also becoming the least viewed episode of the season after "Fizbo" and "Not in My House", but the most viewed program on ABC. The episode ranked 20th in the 18-49 weekly ratings with 4.523 million viewers from the rating.

=== Reviews ===
"Fears" received generally positive reviews.

Robert Canning of IGN gave the episode an 8.7 saying it was "Great" and "Modern Family has always been adept at adding those touching moments to the laughs. Good to know the series hasn't missed a step during its Olympic down time."

Jason Hughes of the TV Squad gave the episode a positive review saying "In 16 episodes, most of which were fantastic, this was the first one to choke out a genuine emotional response from me. Phil's closing monologue was touching, and touched on another fear that all parents face: the fear of your children growing up too fast. That, and the fear that they're going to kill someone in your car."

Donna Bowman from The A.V. Club gave the episode a A− saying it was "The voiceover about fear being an essential part of parenting rang true, and was illustrated perfectly with Manny's (and Jay's) coaster ride, Alex being asked to dance ("but what if they don't?" she asks her mother hesitantly after putting on a brave face all day), and Haley driving off on her own. We have to be there to rescue our children, and then we have to stand back and try to act like we don't think they need rescuing."

Lesley Savage of Entertainment Weekly gave the episode a positive review and said "I don’t know about you guys, but I really missed my Family these past two weeks, and this episode was the perfect welcome back. It kept things in the family, no cameos, no big stunts, just each member doing what they do best. And it started off with a bang — with everyone stating what his or her greatest fears were."
