= My Funky Valentine =

- Modern Family episode
- Claire (Julie Bowen) and Phil (Ty Burrell) as their alter-egos, Julianna and Clive
- Episode no.: Season 1 Episode 15
- Directed by: Michael Spiller
- Written by: Jerry Collins
- Production code: 1ARG16
- Original air date: February 10, 2010

Guest appearances
- David Brenner as himself; Reid Ewing as Dylan; Andrew Borba as Principal Balaban

Episode chronology
← Previous "Moon Landing"	Next → "Fears"
- Modern Family season 1

"My Funky Valentine" is the fifteenth episode of first season of the American family sitcom television series Modern Family and the fifteenth episode of the series overall. It premiered on ABC on February 10, 2010. The episode was written by Jerry Collins and directed by Michael Spiller.

In the episode, Claire and Phil meet up at a bar to celebrate Valentine's Day, and they indulge in role playing. Claire decides to take off her clothes and put on only her coat to seduce Phil, but things take a wrong turn when the two of them become trapped on an escalator. Before that, Gloria and Jay were at a comedy club to watch David Brenner perform. Mitchell and Cameron try to help out Manny with a girl he likes.

"My Funky Valentine" received positive reviews from television critics.

== Plot ==
Phil (Ty Burrell) and Claire (Julie Bowen) arrange their Valentine's date at their usual restaurant, but after being shocked by Dylan's (Reid Ewing) present for Haley (Sarah Hyland), they decide to spend the night at a hotel and indulge in some role playing instead. Phil poses as Clive Bixby, a visiting businessman, and Claire as Julianna, a local housewife. The two meet at the hotel bar and he "picks her up"; she goes to the bathroom and comes back wearing her coat with no clothes underneath. They prepare to go upstairs, but her coat gets caught in the escalator, putting her in a compromising position.

Mitchell (Jesse Tyler Ferguson) and Cameron (Eric Stonestreet) break their Valentine's date, because Mitchell is preoccupied with a case that he has been working on for weeks. When his client decides to settle before Mitchell has the opportunity to give one of his best speeches, he comes back home frustrated and with no Valentine's spirit.

Manny (Rico Rodriguez) arrives at Mitchell and Cameron's home, since Cameron agreed to look after him. That seems to lift Mitchell a bit but it soon goes south when they see that Manny is terribly depressed because he wrote a Valentine poem for a girl, but another classmate took the credit. They go to the restaurant where Manny had arranged for his date, and he confronts her about the true authorship of the poem. The other boy denies plagiarizing Manny's poem, and Mitchell then defends Manny by using the speech he was going to use from his case, which makes Cameron happy. Unfortunately, the girl still likes the other boy, because he tells her he had the feelings mentioned in the poem, but just didn't know how to express them.

Jay (Ed O'Neill) and Gloria (Sofía Vergara) go to a comedy club at the hotel where David Brenner is performing. They initially enjoy it, until David catches sight of them and starts making fun of Jay's age. After getting angry, Jay excuses himself. Gloria comes to comfort him and they leave to go salsa dancing, which was Gloria's first choice for the evening anyway. Gloria and Jay come across Phil and Claire, stuck on the escalator. Gloria takes off her coat and puts it over Claire, allowing Claire to shimmy out of her trapped coat while preserving her dignity in the crowded hotel.

The next morning Phil calls Claire to discuss the previous night's romantic escapades at the hotel, not realizing that she's driving the kids to school and they can all hear what he is saying on the minivan's speakerphone.

== Reception ==
=== Ratings ===
In its original American broadcast, "My Funky Valentine" was viewed by 9.84 million viewers with a Nielsen rating of 4.2/11, matching with the previous rating high from "Fifteen Percent" and the pilot episode and helping it come second in its timeslot after American Idol, and making it the most viewed episode on ABC Comedy Wednesday helping ABC come third for the night after CBS and FOX. The episode ranked 13th in the 18-49 rating with 5,438 million viewers from that rating watching and ranked 23rd in the total viewership for the week.

=== Reviews ===
The episode received positive reviews.

Robert Canning from IGN gave the episode an 8.6 saying it was "Great" and "the three storylines from "My Funky Valentine" had a lot of laughs. The episode continued to prove Modern Family is the best new comedy of the season."

Jason Hughes of TV Squad gave the episode a positive review saying that "Again, it's those genuine little moments that help the audience believe in these characters, and believing in them makes the situations they find themselves in that much funnier."

Donna Bowman of The A.V. Club gave the episode an A− saying that "It may not be the freshest idea in the world, but I haven't laughed this hard at a sitcom in a long time." and that "Nothing new about these storylines. But it's not about the situation -- it's about the comedy. And what we have here are comic actors playing characters -- especially Mitchell, Cam, and Phil -- that can make everything old new again."

Lesley Savage of Entertainment Weekly gave the episode a positive review saying that "How is it possible that this show gets funnier every week? I mean, you would think that it would have to plateau at some point, but the last few episodes have just gotten better and better. While I thought that last week was ultra-quote worthy, this week's Valentine's Day-themed episode may have just topped it.
