= Airport 2010 =

- Modern Family episode
- Episode no.: Season 1 Episode 22
- Directed by: Jason Winer
- Written by: Bill Wrubel; Dan O'Shannon
- Production code: 1ARG19
- Original air date: May 5, 2010

Guest appearances
- Tom Wright as Security Guard; Reid Ewing as Dylan

Episode chronology
← Previous "Travels with Scout"	Next → "Hawaii"
- Modern Family season 1

"Airport 2010" is the twenty-second episode of the first season of the American television sitcom series Modern Family and the twenty-second episode of the series overall. It premiered on May 5, 2010, on ABC. The episode was written by Bill Wrubel & Dan O'Shannon and directed by Jason Winer.

In the episode, Gloria invites the whole family on a getaway to Hawaii for Jay's birthday much to Jay's chagrin. While waiting for their flight, Mitchell realizes that he does not have his wallet and ID. Phil offers to drive him back home, something that upsets Claire, who has a fear of flying. Manny is kept for questioning after his name matches a name on a no-fly list and Haley flirts with a boy while Dylan is trapped inside the Dunphys' house.

The episode references Lost which Julie Bowen guest starred in. "Airport 2010" received positive reviews from critics, with specific praise for Ed O'Neill's performance as Jay. Despite the positive reviews the episode dropped three-tenths from last week's episode, "Travels with Scout", and was viewed by 9.48 million viewers according to the Nielsen Media Research.

== Plot ==
For Jay's (Ed O'Neill) birthday, Gloria (Sofía Vergara) plans a vacation to Hawaii for the two of them; and then surprises him by revealing that she has paid for the entire family to come along. In addition to secretly desiring a quiet getaway, Jay wonders whether Gloria is deliberately avoiding spending time alone with him.

Meanwhile, Mitchell (Jesse Tyler Ferguson) discovers he has forgotten his wallet, containing his ID, at home. He blames Cameron (Eric Stonestreet) for not packing it, although Cameron points out that Mitchell never specifically asked him to do so. Phil (Ty Burrell) convinces Mitchell that he can drive him home and back in time to make the flight. This annoys Claire (Julie Bowen) who believes her husband should have known how nervous flying makes her and he should stay with her. She visits the airport bar to calm her nerves, where she sees Jay and reassures him that Gloria loves him.

Haley (Sarah Hyland) notices a cute boy and flirts with him. Eventually, Haley discovers the boy is just fourteen, much to Alex's (Ariel Winter) amusement. In the meantime, she neglects a text from her boyfriend Dylan (Reid Ewing), who is locked inside the Dunphys' house by accident. Sad that Haley would be leaving, Dylan had accidentally fallen asleep beside her bed the night before and became trapped by the Dunphy's security system when the family left the following morning. On his attempt to get out of the house, he triggers the alarm.

While waiting in the airport, Claire complains to Cameron about Phil's inability to foresee her needs. Cameron tells her that she needs to be more vocal instead of expecting Phil to read her mind. After retrieving Mitchell's wallet, Mitchell and Phil have a parallel conversation about Cameron in the car, where Phil explains to Cameron he needs to try and pick up when Mitchell needs help even if he doesn't ask for it. When they reach the airport, everyone apologizes to their respective partners.

Meanwhile Manny (Rico Rodriguez) matches a name on a no-fly list and is held for questioning. Jay finds Gloria and Manny in the holding area, where Manny is being questioned. The guard is suspicious when he sees that Manny has a different return date than Gloria, something that makes Gloria reveal to Jay that she wanted to spend some time alone with him so Manny and the rest of the family will be returning home several days before she and Jay do. At the end, Manny and Gloria are cleared for flight and the entire family boards the plane to Hawaii.

== Production ==
The episode was written by Dan O'Shannon and Bill Wrubel making it both their third writing credit. Wrubel previously wrote "The Bicycle Thief" and "Moon Landing" while O'Shannon previously wrote "Come Fly with Me" and "Undeck the Halls". The episode was directed by series main director, Jason Winer. The episode also guest stars Reid Ewing as recurring character, Dylan.

This episode is the first of a two-episode story arc in which all three families go on a trip to Hawaii to celebrate Jay's 63rd birthday. The episode was filmed the week of March 1–7, 2010. The episode was revealed by co-creator and executive producer Steven Levitan to Michael Ausiello.

== Cultural references ==
The episode title is a reference to the Airport sequels, Airport 1975, Airport '77 and The Concorde ... Airport '79.

Luke (Nolan Gould) makes a reference to fellow ABC show Lost, which was ending the same year this episode aired and guest starred Julie Bowen as Sarah Shephard.

When Luke sits on Jay's "Ludlums" (eight novels by Robert Ludlum on his e-reader) Jay opens the cover and the glass tinkles into his lap, he says "not fair, it's not fair." This references the original Twilight Zone episode "Time Enough at Last". In the episode there is an antisocial man with bad vision and very thick glasses who wants nothing more than to be completely alone so he can read his books. One day there is a disaster that kills everyone but him, and one of the only buildings left standing is the library. He sits down to read to his heart's content, but his glasses fall off and hit the ground, he picks them up to put them on and the glass from the lens falls tinkling on to his lap. He sits down and says "it isn't fair, it just isn't fair."

== Reception ==
=== Ratings ===
In its original American broadcast, "Airport 2010" was viewed by an estimated 9.32 million households, according to Nielsen Media Research. It scored an 18-49 rating of 3.8 and a share of 11%, which is down three tenths from last week's episode, "Travels with Scout" and coming second in its time slot. "Airport 2010" also became the top rated scripted on Wednesday for the 10th consecutive week. The episode also ranked 9th in the weekly 18-49 ratings the 3rd highest rated ABC show on the list.

=== Reviews ===
"Airport 2010" received positive reviews.

Robert Canning of IGN gave the episode a 9.4 saying "There was a lot to enjoy in "Airport 2010." It was nonstop fun from beginning to end" and praised Ed O'Neill's performance saying "it was O'Neill's [sic] performance as our favorite lovable curmudgeon that kept this zany episode grounded."

Jason Hughes gave the episode a positive review as well writing "Only 'Modern Family' could pull off having a set-up episode for their big Hawaiian vacation and have it succeed in its own right." and also "am really looking forward to watching this ensemble and this cast cut loose on Hawaii".

Donna Bowman of The A.V. Club gave the episode a A− saying "But I think this was Modern Family back in cracking good form. Not everything worked perfectly, but this is a great start to what amounts to a three-part season finale." She also noted "Ed O'Neill's mumbly, wounded bitterness really makes it work."

Margaret Lyons of Entertainment Weekly gave the episode a positive review as well, writing "Like most ensemble comedies, Family is its best when the various storylines converge or illuminate one another, and this episode at least boasted a central theme"

TV Fanatic gave the episode a 4 out of 5 writing "We loved watching Jay's exasperated reaction as the surprises piled up" and loved the Lost reference.

James Poniewozik of Time gave the episode a positive review as well, writing "It was an insightful way of showing the kinds of misunderstandings that can crop up between people who care about each other, but show it in different ways."

Sean Gandert of Paste gave the episode an 87 out of 100 writing "This is the most well-put together episode of Modern Family we've had in months, with no lazy plots or parts thrown in just because."

BuddyTV gave the episode a positive review saying "Though not a complete laugh riot, the episode played out nicely, balancing the silly with the sweet."
