= Fifteen Percent =

- Modern Family episode
- Episode no.: Season 1 Episode 13
- Directed by: Jason Winer
- Written by: Steven Levitan
- Production code: 1ARG12
- Original air date: January 20, 2010

Guest appearances
- Chazz Palminteri as Shorty; Kristen Schaal as Whitney; Reid Ewing as Dylan

Episode chronology
| ← Previous "Not in My House" | Next → "Moon Landing" |

"Fifteen Percent" is the thirteenth episode of the first season of the American family sitcom television series Modern Family, and the thirteenth episode of the series overall. It originally aired on ABC on January 20, 2010. The episode was written by co-creator Steven Levitan and directed by Jason Winer.

In the episode, Jay introduces Cameron to his friends as "a friend of Mitchell" instead of partner, something that makes Mitchell mad and leads him to tell Jay that his friend Shorty is gay. Jay refuses to believe him but when Gloria also notices that to him, he starts to believe that they might be right. Claire has troubles using a universal remote for their home theater system and to prove to Phil that it is not her fault and instead the remote is too complicated, she challenges Phil to teach Haley how to use it. In the meantime, Manny has a date with a girl he has been talking to for a while but never seen before.

The episode achieved a Nielsen rating of 4.2/11, attracting 9.828 million viewers and received positive reviews from critics.

== Plot ==
Jay (Ed O'Neill) and his buddies meet Cameron (Eric Stonestreet), whom Jay introduces as Mitchell's (Jesse Tyler Ferguson) friend. This incenses Mitchell, who tells Jay that Shorty (Chazz Palminteri) sets off his gaydar by the way he talks, dresses and acts. (To the camera, Mitchell and Cameron discuss Mitchell's coming out to his father and that Jay had a hard time accepting it). Jay refuses to believe it, but Gloria (Sofía Vergara) agrees with Mitchell when Jay informs her of his opinion. Jay begins noticing signs after he starts watching how Shorty acts and comes to think that it may be possible, but once he offers support to Shorty, he discovers that his friend is a bad gambler with smart dress habits.

Meanwhile, Gloria gives Manny's (Rico Rodriguez) surprise date, Whitney (Kristen Schaal), a shabbily dressed young woman, a makeover so that she can feel better about herself. Cameron ends up meeting Manny's date, who thinks Cameron may be the guy for her after a short conversation.

Jay confronts Mitchell, telling him that in offering his support to his friend Shorty, he has had to loan him $20,000 to cover gambling debts. Mitchell tells his father he is proud of him, for becoming more open-minded than he was when Mitchell was younger.

Claire (Julie Bowen) has troubles working with Phil's (Ty Burrell) universal remote for their new home theater system because she thinks it is too complicated. Phil disagrees and to prove that it is not, he teaches Haley (Sarah Hyland) how to handle it after Claire decides that no one in their family can learn the remote except from Phil. Once Phil is asleep, Claire begs Haley to teach her how to use the remote because Phil talks to her like a child when he is doing so.

The episode's title refers to Mitchell's concluding voice-over, explaining that people may change a little, perhaps fifteen percent, if they really want to do so.

== Production ==
The episode was written by Steven Levitan who co-created the show and directed by Jason Winer. It is his third episode, written after the pilot and "The Incident". It was Jason Winer's ninth episode he directed the first being the pilot. The episode was both the thirteenth episode aired and broadcast. The episode featured a big list of guest stars including Chazz Palminteri as Shorty, Kristen Schaal as Whitney, Reid Ewing as Dylan, Darius Dudly as Dale, William Jones as Scotty and Bernardo Badillo as Delivery man.

== Reception ==
=== Ratings ===
In its original American broadcast, "Fifteen Percent" was viewed by 9.829 million viewers with an 18-49 rating of 4.2/11. The episode recovered from a sharp drop in both overall viewers and 18-49 ratings the previous week, and received the best rating since the pilot episode. The episode ranked 21st in the weekly ratings the highest ranking for Modern Family and became the third highest ranking show on ABC after The Bachelor and Grey's Anatomy. Also it ranked 9th in the weekly 18-49 ratings.

=== Reviews ===
"Fifteen Percent" got positive reviews.

Robert Canning of IGN gave the episode a 7.9/10, the lowest review yet saying that "This was the set up for three storylines showing us just how much people can actually change. Two of those storylines were silly sitcom filler with just enough good jokes not to become dull."

Jason Hughes of TV Squad gave it a positive review saying that "As usual, there was a ton going on this week, with all three families dealing with different types of crises. Kristen Schaal (Flight of the Conchords) was in one of the more unusual guest roles I've seen in awhile [sic]. You can't really describe how she came to be on the episode without it sounding all kinds of creepy, and yet the show managed to avoid any of the cliche reactions to what happened." and that "There's just something more authentic about all these relationships, and I think a lot of it is bucking expectations.

Lesley Savage of Entertainment Weekly gave it a positive review saying that " Tonight’s overarching theme was about change – big and small. From guest star Kristen Schaal’s makeover to Jay’s slow acceptance of his friend’s supposed (but ultimately false) homosexuality, to Claire’s ability to handle technology and admit she can be wrong. But this being Modern Family, no one actually changed that much (and thank goodness for that, we love them all as they are) — just 15 percent."

Emily VanDerWerff of The A.V. Club gave it an A with readers giving it a B+ saying that "It can be a little easy to think that the Dunphy stuff isn't as interesting when it's in its own little bubble, particularly as so many of the stories boil down to the sort of "Husbands are dumb, and wives are smart!" stuff that so many sitcoms have already been built around. But I liked what "Fifteen Percent" did with this storyline, even as it delved into a fairly stereotypical storyline in and of itself. Claire doesn't know how to use the AV system in the living room? Y'don't say. Yet, at the same time, this is the kind of storyline that still rings true enough to life that it has some bite to it, and it also gives Phil one of the rare occasions when he's the smart one in the relationship, with Claire having to turn to him to figure out what's going on".
