= Family Portrait (Modern Family) =

- Modern Family episode
- The Family Portrait
- Episode no.: Season 1 Episode 24
- Directed by: Jason Winer
- Written by: Ilana Wernick
- Production code: 1ARG22
- Original air date: May 19, 2010

Guest appearance
- Kobe Bryant as himself

Episode chronology
← Previous "Hawaii"	Next → "The Old Wagon"
- Modern Family season 1

"Family Portrait" is the twenty-fourth episode and season finale of the first season of the American family sitcom television series Modern Family and the twenty-fourth episode of the series overall. It originally aired on ABC on May 19, 2010. The episode was written by Ilana Wernick and directed by Jason Winer. It guest stars Kobe Bryant and Sean Smith.

In the episode, Claire makes an effort to take a new family portrait. Gloria and Manny go with Phil and Alex to a Lakers game and share an awkward moment on the jumbo-tron. Cameron gets a job as a wedding singer while Mitchell takes care of Lily and battles with a pigeon that entered the house. Luke interviews Jay for a school project. After many mishaps, the family is barely on time for the portrait but Claire's perfectionism gets on Jay who starts a mud fight. The portrait is not as perfect as Claire was imagining it but she admits that she loves the result.

"Family Portrait" became the second-highest-rated show in the show's history and received positive reviews from critics, with many praising the scene where Mitchell attempts to kill the pigeon while Cameron is singing "Ave Maria".

The photograph of the three families taken in this episode could be seen hanging on the walls of the three families' houses throughout the rest of the series. The series finale of the show concluded with a shot of the portrait followed by a fade to black.

== Plot ==
Claire's (Julie Bowen) perfect plans for a beautiful family portrait are pulled apart by various mishaps.

Phil (Ty Burrell) takes Alex (Ariel Winter) to a Lakers game with Gloria (Sofía Vergara) and Manny (Rico Rodriguez). During the game, Claire and Haley (Sarah Hyland) see Phil on TV. Claire phones him, but then sees him reject the call. Phil and Gloria appear on the "kiss cam", and when they don't initially kiss, the crowd boos causing Gloria to plant one on Phil. Alex then gets a message saying that Claire was angry with Phil after seeing him on TV. Although Claire didn't see the kiss, Phil now thinks she did.

A stray pigeon enters Mitchell (Jesse Tyler Ferguson) and Cameron's (Eric Stonestreet) house, and Mitchell battles to get it out. As a result, he destroys the house. Cameron gets a job as a wedding singer and Luke (Nolan Gould) interviews Jay (Ed O'Neill) for a school project. Luke finds Jay's stories boring so Jay invents much more exciting ones. Haley gets a pimple and tries to get her mother to postpone the portrait, something that Claire does not agree to.

All the while Claire battles the Dunphys' broken stair to fix it so everything would be perfect for the portrait. She ends up destroying it completely so she calls Mitchell to ask him to do the shooting at his place. After his battle with the pigeon though, the house is in the worst condition for a photo shooting so he tells her what she is asking is impossible.

Nonetheless, Claire manages to get the whole family perfectly dressed and barely on time for the picture. However various squabbles come up, including the kiss, Cameron being angry over the destroyed house, Haley’s pimple and also Gloria’s choice of dress. Jay tries to calm Claire down but eventually Claire's perfectionism finally gets to him and he starts a mud fight, dirtying their perfect white costumes. This loosens everyone up, and instead of the perfect portrait the family instead take a series of fun pictures in varying positions. While later hanging the framed picture, Claire admits that she loves the result more than any perfectly posed family portrait.

== Production ==
The episode was written by Ilana Wenick and directed by Jason Winer.

The episode also guest stars Kobe Bryant as himself in a short cameo and Sean Smith as the photographer. Pau Gasol and Luke Walton guest starred in the episode, but their parts were cut from the episode. This was revealed by ABC representative, Yani Chang by e-mail. The episode is also being included on the DVD, the episode will have a "Making of" for the season 1 DVD as well.

== Cultural references ==
Cameron sings the song "Ave Maria" at the wedding. The same scene where the song is played while Mitchell is trying to kill the bird is very similar to John Woo movies. The scene is also similar to The Godfather.

Phil tells Luke to go through the sprinkler the "Hurt Locker" way, in a reference to the film The Hurt Locker. Phil makes a reference to Willy Wonka.

== Reception ==
=== Ratings ===
In its original American broadcast, "Family Portrait" was viewed by 10.01 million viewers, receiving a 4.2 rating/11% share in the 18-49 demographic becoming the second highest-rated episode of the series history. It also beat American Idol in the Men 18-34 demographic and became the Wednesday's #1 Scripted Show for the 12th consecutive week. "Family Portrait" ranked 10th in the 18-49 demographic weekly ratings becoming the 4th highest-rated episode and the 3rd highest-rated show of the week on American Broadcasting Company and 21st in the weekly total viewers the 6th most viewed episode and 4th most viewed show of the week on American Broadcasting Company.

=== Reviews ===
"Family Portrait" received generally positive reviews.

Robert Canning from IGN gave the episode a 9.2/10 saying it was "Outstanding" and "So as great as Maui was, "Family Portrait" was indeed the best way to end Modern Family's premiere season."

Donna Bowman of The A.V. Club gave the episode an "A−" writing "no way Claire manages to calm down enough about her ruined picture at the scene, although I can buy her loving the picture after the fact -- almost everything else that happened tonight made me cringe because I recognized some part of myself or my family in it."

Jason Hughes of TV Squad remarked "Lucky for me, it was brilliant and packed with far, far more goodness to enjoy."

Emily Exton of Entertainment Weekly gave the episode a positive review and stated that Luke was the best character of the episode once again saying "From falling asleep to his grandfather’s stories about the ’60s, to being plastic-wrapped and walking Hurt Locker-style (pure genius!) across the lawn, I’ve grown to appreciate and crave his hilarious and slightly delayed responses to things."

TV Fanatic gave the episode a 4.4/5 writing " already considered your opening season one of the strongest in TV history. Did you really have to prove that this week by even making Kobe Bryant funny?!?"

Alison Stern-Dunyak of BuddyTV said the best moment of the episode was "Most prominent, however, was the show's best sequence, a lengthy, nearly wordless scene that cut between Cameron singing "Ave Maria" at a wedding and Mitchell destroying their home chasing an invading pigeon."

James Poniewozik of Time stated "Portrait" set out to do what some of Modern Family's best episodes have done, notably "Fizbo," in my opinion the show's best episode overall: it moves the characters toward one central event, setting in place the elements for both hilarious disaster and a moment of catharsis. "Portrait" did that" and he also loved The Godfather parody scene.

=== Award nominations ===
This episode was nominated for a Primetime Emmy Award for Outstanding Picture Editing for a Comedy Series (Single or Multi-Camera) and was nominated along with the eventual winner of the category: The Pilot of Modern Family.

Jesse Tyler Ferguson was also nominated for a Primetime Emmy Award for Outstanding Supporting Actor in a Comedy Series for playing Mitchell Pritchett.
