= Moon Landing (Modern Family) =

- Modern Family episode
- Jay (Ed O'Neill) and Cameron (Eric Stonestreet) at the gym's locker-room
- Episode no.: Season 1 Episode 14
- Directed by: Jason Winer
- Written by: Bill Wrubel
- Production code: 1ARG13
- Original air date: February 3, 2010

Guest appearances
- Minnie Driver as Valerie; Reid Ewing as Dylan

Episode chronology
← Previous "Fifteen Percent"	Next → "My Funky Valentine"
- Modern Family season 1

"Moon Landing" is the fourteenth episode of the first season of the American family sitcom television series Modern Family and the fourteenth episode of the series overall. It was originally scheduled to premiere on ABC on January 27, 2010, but it was preempted by the State of the Union address and pushed back a week to February 3, 2010. The episode was written by Bill Wrubel and directed by Jason Winer.

In the episode, Mitchell tries to offer his legal advice to Gloria after a car crash she was involved, believing that it was not her fault. Claire meets an old friend from work, Valerie, and thinks that Valerie pities her for leaving her job years back to raise her family. Claire wants to prove to her that she made the right decision. Jay and Cameron go to the gym to play racquetball but an incident in the locker room does not allow Jay to concentrate on the game.

The episode achieved a Nielsen rating of 3.9/10, attracted 9.19 million viewers and received positive reviews from critics.

== Plot ==
Jay (Ed O'Neill) asks Mitchell (Jesse Tyler Ferguson) for legal advice for Gloria (Sofía Vergara) who had been involved in a car crash. While Mitchell thinks that it is not Gloria's fault, Manny (Rico Rodriguez) informs him that it was his mom's fault since she is a terrible driver.

Mitchell tries to bring up the possibility that it was her fault but Gloria gets mad accusing him of being stereotypical. She leaves saying that she does not need him as a lawyer anymore. A little bit later, she comes back to apologize and to ask for Mitchell's help again for a second car crash. This time she crashed into a restaurant while she was attempting to leave.

Claire (Julie Bowen) is going to meet with an old friend from work, Valerie (Minnie Driver). While they are talking, Claire realizes that Valerie pities her for quitting her job to raise a family. Claire wants to prove to her that this was not a bad decision and she brings her home to meet her family. Things at the house though are not as perfect as Claire was hoping.

In the meantime, Jay goes to the gym with Cameron (Eric Stonestreet) to play racquetball. A disturbing moment at the locker room though, that Cameron names "moon landing", is enough to make Jay not be able to concentrate at the game. Also, Haley (Sarah Hyland) and Dylan (Reid Ewing) break up and Dylan tries to win her back by standing outside her window playing music on his iPod.

== Reception ==
=== Ratings ===
The episode surprisingly survived against American Idol with 9.194 million viewers and a Nielsen rating of 3.9/11. The episode ranked 14 in the 18–49 rating, but couldn't break the top 20 in total viewership.

=== Reviews ===
The episode got positive reviews.

Robert Canning of IGN gave the episode an 8, saying that it was "Impressive" and "If any one of these story lines had been given more time within the episode, their comic potential could have been better fulfilled. It's possible Valerie could have become more of a character than a cutout. Jay could have had more time to deal with, and more politically incorrect things to say about, his butt bump. But as it were, though the stories were less than fulfilling, Modern Family still delivered a decent amount of laughs."

Jason Hughes of TV Squad gave it a positive review saying that "Sometimes I wonder if I could just write up a review of 'Modern Family' by listing all of the great quotes that come out of this show. Line for line, this has to be one of the cleverest series on television today. Even the episode title, 'Moon Landing,' recalls a great moment".

Donna Bowman of The A.V. Club gave it a B+, saying fans of the ABC hit Lost would be satisfied by the episode.

Lesley Savage of Entertainment Weekly gave it a positive review saying that "Could last night’s episode of Modern Family been any funnier? I mean, I may as well have transcribed the entire episode, because every line had me practically running to my own Porta-Potty. While the whole clan had their side-splitting moments — hello Cam and Jay’s moon landing, which is apparently not as bad as a splashdown — the Dunphy family stole the evening".
