= Hawaii (Modern Family) =

- Modern Family episode
- The whole family arrives in Maui for Jay's (Ed O'Neill) birthday
- Episode no.: Season 1 Episode 23
- Directed by: Steven Levitan
- Written by: Paul Corrigan; Brad Walsh
- Production code: 1ARG23
- Original air date: May 12, 2010

Episode chronology
← Previous "Airport 2010"	Next → "Family Portrait"
- Modern Family season 1

"Hawaii" is the twenty-third episode of Modern Family on the first season and the twenty-third episode of the series overall. It originally premiered on May 12, 2010, on ABC. The episode was written by Paul Corrigan & Brad Walsh and directed by series co-creator Steven Levitan.

In the episode, Jay's plans to do nothing but relax on vacation are interrupted by an unwelcome reality check that leads him to working out instead of having fun. Meanwhile, Phil tries to give Claire the romantic honeymoon and wedding they never had the chance to do due to Claire being pregnant with Haley then. Mitchell and Cameron disagree on whether they should go sight-seeing or not since Mitchell wants to but Cameron just wants to have fun. The kids get themselves into trouble when Haley gets drunk and Luke and Manny do not get along sharing a room.

"Hawaii" received positive reviews from critics, with most praising Phil and Claire renewing their vows, and was viewed by 10.335 million viewers and becoming the second highest-rated episode of the season (behind the pilot episode), according to Nielsen Media Research.

== Plot ==
Continuing from the previous episode, the Pritchett family arrives in Hawaii and stay at the Four Seasons Resort Maui.

Phil (Ty Burrell) wants to turn the vacation into a honeymoon with his wife, as they never got to have a proper one before, or even a proper wedding, due to the unexpected pregnancy of Haley (Sarah Hyland). Claire (Julie Bowen) is concerned that due to their kids, this will not be possible, but Phil tries nonetheless.

Phil takes Claire to an adults-only pool, abandoning their kids with Mitchell (Jesse Tyler Ferguson) and Cameron (Eric Stonestreet). Enjoying their private time, Haley interrupts them by saying she is going to hang out with some kids she just met. Claire is obviously concerned, but Phil manages to convince her to not worry about it. Later, however, Claire learns from Alex (Ariel Winter) that Haley was drunk and throwing up in the bathroom. Claire consoles her and tells her that this would happen every time she drinks alcohol. Later, Phil surprises Claire by having a wedding ceremony prepared, allowing them to have the wedding they wanted.

Mitchell tries to get Cameron to come sightseeing with him, though Cameron just wishes to relax. Cameron pretends to want to go, though he finally decides not to go on one of his tours. Mitchell ends up going alone, and then returns to relax, with Cameron apologizing for wanting him to go with him. Later, Mitchell and Cameron accidentally leave Lily in the elevator, and they lose her, but Gloria (Sofía Vergara) finds her and brings her back to them. A while later, though, Mitchell and Cameron lose Lily again when they go to a Banana plantation.

Jay (Ed O'Neill) is eager to relax and eat fatty foods, though a call from his brother reminds him that his father had died at 63 due to his poor health. Jay is inspired to take better care of himself, prompting him to spend the vacation working out and being more active, annoying Gloria, who had just wished to relax. At the end of the day, Jay ends up having his back give way, resting in a hammock and being late for his birthday dinner. Phil goes to find him, leading to an awkward moment where Phil ends up lying on top of Jay. Phil helps him back to the party, where Jay reveals to Gloria why he is being more active and that he does not want to end up like his father. Afterwards, Jay gives in and relaxes with Gloria, ordering fatty foods as well.

On the plane home, Claire is horrified when Phil tells her that he has lined up a female colleague of his as a replacement for her in the event of Claire's death.

== Production ==
The episode, "Hawaii" was written by Paul Corrigan & Brad Walsh and directed by series co-creator, Steven Levitan. It is their fourth writing credit together after "Run for Your Wife", "Fizbo", and "Travels with Scout". It was also the first directing credit of Steven Levitan who co-created the show with Christopher Lloyd.

This episode is the second and last of a two-episode story arc which was started in the previous episode, "Airport 2010", which depicts all three families going on a trip to Hawaii to celebrate Jay's 63rd birthday. The episode was filmed the week of March 1–7, 2010 and was the last episode filmed for the first season.

== Reception ==
=== Ratings ===
In its original American broadcast, "Hawaii" was viewed by 10.335 million viewers with a 4.3 rating/11% share in the 18-49 demographic making it the highest-rated episode of the season. The episode also came second in its timeslot after American Idol. It was also the best performance against American Idol both in viewers and ratings. The show also beat American Idol for the first time in the Men 18-35 demographic and became the top rated scripted program for the 11th consecutive week and became the second-most viewed episode of the season after "Pilot". The episode ranked sixth in the weekly 18-49 ratings becoming for the first time the highest rated of ABC and ranked 23rd in total viewers becoming the 5th highest viewed ABC show.

=== Reviews ===
The episode received positive reviews from critics.

Robert Canning of IGN gave the episode an 8.8 saying it was "Great" and "While "Hawaii" was not as fantastic as its predecessor and did have a few shortcomings, it was still a funny episode that was fun to watch".

Jason Hughes of TV Squad wrote "thanks a lot 'Modern Family' for showing us such a beautiful looking and relaxing family vacation." He also said that Phil surprising Claire with the renewal of their vows was perfect.

Donna Bowman of The A.V. Club gave the episode an A saying "The writing is inventive, the timing is crisp, and all three nodes of the extended family get their laughs in".

Emily Paxton of Entertainment Weekly said ". For me, relaxing means kicking back with an A+ episode of Modern Family" she also said the vow renewal was almost as sweet as The Office episode "Niagara"'s moment when Jim gave Pam her surprise.

Matt Richental from TV Fanatic gave the episode a 4.8/5 and remarked that "There was true sentiment at the heart of Phil and Claire's vow renewal, as Modern Family manages to deliver both laughs and emotion on a weekly basis"

BuddyTV gave the episode a positive review writing "although the family may have been on vacation, it's clear the writers were hard at work--creating one of the season's best half-hours."

Matt Roush of TV Guide gave the episode a positive review writing ". Plenty of comedies amuse me, but few move me the way this does."

The ending of the episode was praised by most critics. Donna Bowman of The A.V. Club said "It's a moment that indicates the potential Modern Family has for heart to go along with its demonstrated expertise in comedy." Robert Canning said "It was a sweet way to end the family trip." Emily Paxton compared it to "Niagara" (The Office episode). Matt Roush called it "a genuinely sweet wedding ceremony".
