= Up All Night (Modern Family) =

- Modern Family episode
- Episode no.: Season 1 Episode 11
- Directed by: Michael Spiller
- Written by: Christopher Lloyd
- Production code: 1ARG10
- Original air date: January 6, 2010

Guest appearance
- Benjamin Bratt as Javier

Episode chronology
← Previous "Undeck the Halls"	Next → "Not in My House"
- Modern Family season 1

"Up All Night" is the eleventh episode of the first season of the American family sitcom television series Modern Family and the eleventh episode of the series overall. It premiered on ABC in the United States on January 6, 2010. The episode was written by co-creator Christopher Lloyd and directed by Michael Spiller. The episode features the first appearance of Javier, Manny's biological father and Gloria's first husband, portrayed by Benjamin Bratt.

In the episode, Gloria is annoyed at Jay's reaction to Javier, Manny's unreliable dad, but manages to let Jay allow Javier stay for the night. Jay is seduced by Javier's manner, leading Gloria to take action. Phil suffers from kidney stones and Claire calls the firemen to rush him to hospital. Mitchell and Cameron try to train Lily into sleeping alone but they have hard time doing it, especially Cameron.

The episode was rated 4.1/11 (the highest since the pilot episode) and received positive reviews from the critics.

== Plot ==
Gloria (Sofía Vergara) is less than pleased with Jay's (Ed O'Neill) reaction to the arrival of Javier (Benjamin Bratt), Manny's (Rico Rodriguez) infamously unreliable dad. Gloria talks Jay into allowing Javier to stay the night after Javier shows up a day late to visit Manny. Javier calls in a favor and takes Manny and Jay to a baseball field at night. The next day, Javier shows up with motorcycles and says they are for Jay and him to ride. Gloria forces Manny to go to school and has a discussion with Jay that he is now being seduced by Javier's manner just as she was in the past. Jay denies it but waits by the phone for Javier.

Meanwhile, Phil (Ty Burrell) is suffering from kidney stones. While suffering from the pain, Luke (Nolan Gould) takes advantage to confess to breaking the glass coffee table which cost the Dunphys their hired help when he blamed it on her (and who was deported as jobless). Phil's dramatics leave Claire (Julie Bowen) no other choice but to call for the firemen to rush him to the hospital. Claire dresses up, wearing a revealing top and tight jeans to look nice much to Phil's dismay. Phil ends up in the hospital to have the stones removed. He plans on taking advantage of the guilt Claire feels for flirting with the firemen but it is short-lived, as she discovers the very attractive patients a couple of rooms down that Phil visited while in the hospital.

Mitchell (Jesse Tyler Ferguson) and Cameron (Eric Stonestreet) have a harder time than Lily as they attempt to sleep train her. Mitchell discovers Cameron cries all night listening to Lily cry and introduces Lily to Brian De Palma's Scarface. While Mitchell is trying to use the Ferber method of getting an infant to learn to sleep on their own, Cameron keeps running to the room - making Mitchell force him to return to their own bedroom. Mitchell comes home in the afternoon to keep Cameron from indulging Lily. They struggle a bit as Cameron insists on going to Lily's room, and in the ensuing confusion, Mitchell hurts his ankle - when Mitchell suggests they go to the hospital, Cameron starts thinking of the firemen and approves.

The episode wraps up with a reference to the opening bit - the kids have been told to act like adults and Alex remarks that if they're to act like the adults in their family, how hard could it be?

== Production ==
The episode was written by co-creator Christopher Lloyd and directed by Michael Spiller. The episode was later put in for a Primetime Emmy Award for Outstanding Supporting Actor in a Comedy Series for Ty Burrell.

== Reception ==
=== Ratings ===
"Up All Night" was viewed by 10.221 million viewers, competing primarily against reruns on the other networks. It ranked first in the timeslot and on ABC that night. As of its airing, it is the second most watched episode of the series after the pilot episode despite airing against CBS' People's Choice Awards, an annual ratings draw. The episode also made it into the top 30 debuting at #25 in its original American broadcast and came in 12th for the 18-49 rating.

=== Reviews ===
Robert Canning of IGN gave the episode 9/10 saying that "The three very separate storylines in Wednesday night's Modern Family had one important thing in common: hilarity", "Phil Dunphy stole the episode. Watching him suffer through the agony of a kidney stone ('Death is coming!') and over-exaggerate the possibility of his demise ('There is a scenario where you could be the man of the house, and you need to know all the PIN numbers and passwords') was painfully funny stuff", and "Modern Family still finds a way to pull everything together for a solid, funny half-hour.".

Chris "Boomer" Beachum and Rob Licuria of the "Los Angeles Times" said that Ty Burrell with this episode had the second biggest chance of winning the Emmy Award after Eric Stonestreet of Modern Family.
