= Truth Be Told (Modern Family) =

- Modern Family episode
- Phil (Ty Burrell) trying to avoid his ex-girlfriend, Denise (Judy Greer)
- Episode no.: Season 1 Episode 17
- Directed by: Jason Winer
- Written by: Joe Lawson
- Production code: 1ARG17
- Original air date: March 10, 2010

Guest appearances
- Judy Greer as Denise; Bruce Altman as Mr. Jennings

Episode chronology
← Previous "Fears"	Next → "Starry Night"
- Modern Family season 1

"Truth Be Told" is the seventeenth episode of the first season of Modern Family. and the seventeenth episode of the series overall. It originally aired on ABC on March 10, 2010. The episode was written by Joe Lawson and directed by Jason Winer.

In the episode, Phil is about to meet with his ex-girlfriend, Denise, who he keeps talking with via Facebook. Phil believes that the two of them are just friends now but Claire warns him that things are not as he thinks, and she is proven right. Jay accidentally kills Manny's turtle pet and tries to cover up his action by inventing a story with a raccoon breaking into the house. Gloria thought, makes him confess his action to Manny. Mitchell worries that he misses significant moments in Lily's development due to his job as he works too many hours. In an attempt to stand up to his boss so he can spend more time with his family, he ends up losing his job.

"Truth Be Told" received positive reviews from television critics.

== Plot ==
In the Dunphy family plotline, the family has a notion to go see a movie, but Phil (Ty Burrell) opts out due to conflicting plans on meeting his ex-girlfriend, Denise (Judy Greer). Claire (Julie Bowen) discovers that he has been talking to her via Facebook for a year, and suspects that Denise sees his messages as sensual and seductive, even if Phil does not. Phil believes it to be merely friendship, but shortly after Denise pays a visit, he discovers that Claire was right. Denise keeps on trying to get Phil and her to have an affair. She gives him her hotel keys, shows him a revealing picture, does an air bite, and repeatedly touches Phil. Meanwhile, Alex (Ariel Winter) teases Luke (Nolan Gould) into convincing him he is adopted, and Denise plans to take him back home after her visit. Relations deteriorate with Denise after Claire discovers that Phil started dating Claire while still in a relationship with Denise; Denise angrily leaves.

In the Pritchett-Delgado family plotline, Jay (Ed O'Neill) tries to urge Manny (Rico Rodriguez) that failure does not necessarily make a person weak. He gives Manny a Successories poster but Manny does not really accept it. Jay decides to place the poster on Manny's wall to help reinforce his idea. Unfortunately, the poster falls into Manny's terrarium, killing Manny's pet turtle Shel Turtlestein. Jay creates an elaborate alibi by faking a break-in by a raccoon. Gloria (Sofía Vergara) sees through the falsehood and urges Jay to confess. Jay spends the day justifying the deception by relating a similar incident where he owned up to the truth when he accidentally killed Mitchell's (Jesse Tyler Ferguson) pet bird Fly-za Minnelli and it wounded their relationship. Ultimately, Jay's conscience wins and he confesses - Manny tells him he had it figured out the entire time.

In the Pritchett-Tucker family plotline, Mitchell has been missing significant moments in Lily's development and is increasingly agitated about it. Cameron (Eric Stonestreet) urges Mitchell to review his priorities and Mitchell subsequently decides that on his days off, his priorities are his family and that he hates his job. He tells his boss he is not going to work on the weekend; his boss tells him if he goes home to consider himself fired. Mitchell leaves for home and initially is ecstatic that he stood up for himself but starts having anxiety attacks once he is home regarding the future of the family. Later, Jay tells Mitchell that he will help out while Mitchell looks for a new job. This help turns out to be merely the poster.

== Production ==
The episode was written by Joe Lawson and directed by Jason Winer. This was the second episode that Lawson wrote after "Great Expectations" and the eleventh episode Winer directed.

== Reception ==
=== Ratings ===
In its original American broadcast, "Truth Be Told" earned a 3.7 rating among adults 18-49. The episode rebounded 9% over the previous week's drop.

=== Reviews ===
The episode got mostly positive reviews.

Robert Canning of IGN gave the episode an 8.6/10. He noted the "combo of Jay and Manny continued to establish itself as a great comedy duo". He praised the Dunphy plotline, stating "I could have watched an entire half-hour of Phil dealing with the situation created by a visiting ex-girlfriend."

Jason Hughes of TV Squad gave it a positive review saying that "episode was absolutely brilliant". Additionally, "...the trueness and heart of these characters is what makes the buffoonery we often see so much more palatable. It takes it from broad comedy to character studies we can appreciate and care about."

Lesley Savage of Entertainment Weekly gave it a positive review saying that the episode was "pure genius".

Donna Bowman of The A.V. Club gave it an A with readers giving it a B+. She rated Ty Burrell's performance of Phil dealing with his situation with his ex-girlfriend and his wife "a thing of beauty, and a virtuoso high point of the season." The other two subplots were "just as sitcom-standard, and frequently as funny".

M.L. House of TV Fanatic named Judy Greer the best guest star of the season saying "because she made Phil look sane and reasonable during her stint on the show."
