= En Garde (Modern Family) =

- Modern Family episode
- Claire (Julie Bowen) and Mitchell (Jesse Tyler Ferguson) ice-dancing together
- Episode no.: Season 1 Episode 7
- Directed by: Randall Einhorn
- Written by: Danny Zuker
- Production code: 1ARG06
- Original air date: November 4, 2009

Guest appearances
- Mo Collins as Denise; Amy Landers as Krista Flum; Nolan North as Donald Flum

Episode chronology
← Previous "Run for Your Wife"	Next → "Great Expectations"
- Modern Family season 1

"En Garde" is the seventh episode of the first season of the American family sitcom television series Modern Family and the seventh episode of the series overall. It premiered on ABC in the United States on November 4, 2009. The episode was written by Danny Zuker and directed by Randall Einhorn.

In the episode, Manny takes up fencing and he is quite talented. Jay is very proud of Manny, something that causes Mitchell's childhood ice skating trauma to resurface. These feelings cause Mitchell to confront Claire about it, whom he finds responsible for it. Phil tries to find Luke's hidden talents after Manny's success but without any luck.

"En Garde" became the highest rated scripted show in its timeslot and has received positive reviews from critics. It also won an Emmy Award for Outstanding Sound Mixing for a Comedy or Drama Series (Half-Hour) and Animation.

== Plot ==
Manny (Rico Rodriguez) becomes interested in fencing, and the whole family comes to cheer him on during the match. He is really successful, and he manages to reach the finals, where he has to compete against a girl. Jay (Ed O'Neill) and Gloria (Sofía Vergara) are really proud of him, and they want him to take the trophy. Instead of wanting to compete, though, Manny tells them that he is retired from fencing. Jay tries to change his mind while Gloria supports Manny's decision and says that if Manny feels like it is not fun for him anymore and wants to quit, then he should quit. When Manny explains his decision - he does not want to compete against a girl - Gloria gets mad and convinces him that this is not a good reason to quit.

Before the finals start, Jay and Gloria find out that the girl Manny is competing against has lost both her parents and is suffering from an undisclosed illness. Things get worse when some of her fellow patients arrive to cheer her on. Jay and Gloria try to tell Manny to let her win; however, their signals send him the wrong message. Manny ends up easily winning the competition, which includes him taunting his opponent. Although uneasy at first, Jay's guilt soon subsides thanks to the size of Manny's trophy.

Mitchell (Jesse Tyler Ferguson) sees his dad being so interested in Manny's success, his childhood trauma regarding his ice skating resurfaces. He is mad at Claire (Julie Bowen) because she was the one who quit their team years ago and stole his moment to shine. Cam (Eric Stonestreet), knowing about the ice skating, talks to Claire and asks her to talk to Mitchell about it so he can move on. The two siblings chat, and Mitchell is now free to move on, but not before having a last "ice skating moment" with Claire.

Meanwhile, Phil (Ty Burrell), after seeing Manny being the best at something, he tries to find Luke's (Nolan Gould) hidden talents. He tries baseball, but Luke is bad at it. When he decides to give up, he discovers that Luke is "a natural" at selling while he takes him with him to show a house to a client, much to Phil's happy surprise.

== Reception ==
=== Ratings ===
In its original American broadcast, "En Garde" was viewed by an estimated 8.770 million households and received a 5.3 rating/8% share Nielsen Rating and also got a 3.5 rating/9% share in the 18-49 demographic coming second in its timeslot after the World Series according to the Nielsen Media Research.

=== Reviews ===
"En Garde" received positive reviews.

Eric Hochberger of TV Fanatic named the show a "sitcom heaven". "Overall the best moments were with the family coming together and we loved it. We've heard criticism from around the web that the voiceovers and shared themes are cheesy. To those people we say find another show because we're pretty sure Modern Family is sitcom heaven to us."

Donna Bowman from The A.V. Club gave a B rate to the episode saying: "These last couple of episodes have been a mixed bag. We're seeing, I suspect, an excellent sitcom experiencing the growing pains of a long American season. Tonight there were at least two moments that rank among the best the show has produced. Yet the overall storyline doesn't feel like it has the energy or inventiveness we saw at the start of the season."

Robert Canning of IGN gave the episode an 8.3 calling it "Impressive" and also said "The series has had a knack for this so far, and "En Garde" continued the trend with ease and wit."

Jason Hughes of TV Squad said "So far, they've managed to pack every minute of each episode, and this week was no exception".

=== Awards ===
"En Garde" won an Emmy Award for Outstanding Sound Mixing for a Comedy or Drama Series (Half-Hour) and Animation.
