= Starry Night (Modern Family) =

- Modern Family episode
- Mitch (Jesse Tyler Ferguson), Jay (Ed O'Neill) and Manny (Rico Rodriguez) during the star gazing.
- Episode no.: Season 1 Episode 18
- Directed by: Jason Winer
- Written by: Danny Zuker
- Production code: 1ARG15
- Original air date: March 24, 2010

Guest appearance
- Lombardo Boyar as Jose

Episode chronology
| ← Previous "Truth Be Told" | Next → "Game Changer" |
- Modern Family season 1

"Starry Night" is the eighteenth episode of the first season of Modern Family and the eighteenth episode of the series overall. It originally aired on ABC on March 24, 2010. The episode was written by Danny Zuker and directed by Jason Winer.

In the episode, Claire and Phil take rival approaches to keeping Haley and Luke focused on projects that are due the next day. Manny's ribbing of Mitchell during a trip with Jay causes tension between the three. Cameron tries to make amends with Gloria for past awkward encounters with a night out in her old neighborhood.

The episode received positive reviews and was viewed by 9.18 million viewers with an 18-49 Nielsen Rating of 3.6.

== Plot ==
In the Dunphy household, Luke (Nolan Gould) and Haley (Sarah Hyland) both have projects due and Claire (Julie Bowen) and Phil (Ty Burrell) are responsible for ensuring their children get their work done on time. Claire gives Phil the task of making sure Luke completes a project covering Van Gogh while she keeps track of Haley as she has to cook cupcakes for a fund-raiser. While Phil demonstrates signs of ADHD (narrated in voice-over as Alex (Ariel Winter) tries to convince her mother Luke has the condition), Luke surpasses his mother's low expectations and completes the project.

Meanwhile, Haley manipulates her mother into making the cupcakes for her - only to have Claire throw away all the cupcakes after she is shocked with Luke's success. Luke recites his planned presentation speech to Alex, who is impressed until Luke begins talking about how Van Gogh was warning us of aliens about to attack and Alex calls for her mom.

Mitchell (Jesse Tyler Ferguson) hangs out with Jay (Ed O'Neill) and Manny (Rico Rodriguez) while Cameron (Eric Stonestreet) hangs out with Gloria (Sofía Vergara). Mitchell and Jay have a tradition of watching meteor showers together and Jay brings along Manny to get him out of the house. Cameron attempts to make up for slight offenses over the past couple of weeks with Gloria by inviting her to a fancy restaurant.

Jay and Manny tease Mitchell during the stargazing; Jay is trying to get Manny to overcome a severe disappointment earlier in the week and encourages him to treat Mitchell as a brother would - teasing, joking, camaraderie. Jay asks Mitchell to encourage Manny to not focus on other children calling him "weird" and the two bond. At the same time, Cameron takes Gloria to one of her favorite little eateries, where he tries to bond by eating very spicy food, to which he has a bad reaction. The two end up finding their similarities lie in fashion, shopping and things of that nature.

At the close, the family tries cupcakes that Haley has managed to cook while they celebrated Luke's success. Once Haley is sent to school, they immediately start scrambling to get the horrible taste out of their mouths, as Claire wonders what the phone number for Poison Control is.

== Production ==
"Starry Night" was directed by Jason Winer, marking his twelfth-directed episode of the series. The show was written by Danny Zuker.

== Reception ==
=== Ratings ===
In its original American broadcast, "Starry Night" earned a 3.7 rating among adults 18-49 and was viewed by 9.18 million viewers. The episode dipped slightly from the previous week's numbers. The episode ranked 22nd in the weekly viewership ratings and 13th in the 18-49 rating. Danny Zuker is currently nominated for writing for an Episodic Comedy at the 2011 Writers Guild of America Awards facing six other programs including the Modern Family episode, "Earthquake".

=== Reviews ===
The episode got mostly positive reviews.

Robert Canning of IGN gave the episode a 9.5 saying it was "Incredible" and that ""Starry Night" was a near perfect episode of Modern Family. The storylines were great and tied together in very entertaining ways. The characters delivered what we would expect, while still being able to develop deeper connections between each other. And it was also fall-off-the-couch hilarious. Add the patented Modern Family touching ending and you've got one of their best episodes of this debut season".

Jason Hughes of TV Squad gave "Starry Night" a positive review, saying the changed dynamics "worked better than anyone could have expected." He admired Ty Burrell (Phil)'s "stellar physical comedy" as Phil demonstrated his obvious ADHD. In the end, Hughes stated "these characters still ring more true and real than most families you see on television."

Lesley Savage of Entertainment Weekly gave it a positive review saying that the episode was "so fantastic". She really enjoyed Cameron's performance in the episode, citing his zingers and stating "...if I had to pick one to take home to watch TV with me every night, it would be Cameron."

Donna Bowman of The A.V. Club gave it an A− with readers giving it a B+. She noted that the episode "impressed with the way it all fit together." The episode wasn't a "laugh riot" but was a "well-integrated episode".
