= Great Expectations (Modern Family) =

- Modern Family episode
- Mitchell (Jesse Tyler Ferguson) and Cameron's (Eric Stonestreet) old friend, Sal (Elizabeth Banks)
- Episode no.: Season 1 Episode 8
- Directed by: Jason Winer
- Written by: Joe Lawson
- Production code: 1ARG07
- Original air date: November 18, 2009

Guest appearances
- Elizabeth Banks as Sal; Edward Norton as Izzy LaFontaine; Reid Ewing as Dylan

Episode chronology
← Previous "En Garde"	Next → "Fizbo"
- Modern Family season 1

"Great Expectations" is the eighth episode of the ABC sitcom Modern Family. It premiered in the United States on November 18, 2009. The episode was written by Joe Lawson and directed by Jason Winer.

In the episode, Claire wants to make a special gift to Phil for their anniversary since she always picks the worst presents for him, while he chooses some amazing ones. All the kids are gathered at Jay's house for a sleepover, in a night that Jay calls "Jay's night". Haley does not want to be there and wants to go to a party with Dylan, but Dylan ends up being part of the sleepover with all of them. Mitch and Cameron go out to meet their party friend, Sal, so they can have fun for the first time in a long time only to realize that Sal is jealous of Lily.

"Great Expectations" received positive reviews from television critics.

== Plot ==
Claire (Julie Bowen) has a history of giving bad gifts while Phil (Ty Burrell) has a history of giving her great gifts she really appreciates. So, in an attempt to make up for it, she decides to give Phil a surprising anniversary present, which is a private performance by Izzy LaFontaine (Edward Norton), the fictional bass player of Spandau Ballet. However, this unexpected gift turns out to be a mistake, as Phil was neither a fan of Spandau Ballet (or, as Izzy referred to the fans, "Fandaus") nor their song "True", which Claire believed to be Claire & Phil's special song since it was playing when they first kissed. According to Phil, the couple's "song" was "If You Leave" by Orchestral Manoeuvres in the Dark. Phil ends up appreciating the gesture, and agrees that "True" will be their new song.

Jay (Ed O'Neill) and Gloria (Sofía Vergara) are having all the grandkids (including Lily for the first time) over for a slumber party, a tradition he calls "Jay's Night." Haley (Sarah Hyland) feels like she is too old for family sleepovers and wants to go to a party with her boyfriend Dylan (Reid Ewing). Alex (Ariel Winter) says they should enjoy spending time with their grandfather because they do not know how much longer he will be around - which both confuses and scares Luke (Nolan Gould) into thinking that Jay is dying.

Haley is unable to convince her parents to let her attend the party (which is only three blocks away from Jay's house) and ends up at his sleepover. She makes an attempt to sneak out of the house but is thwarted by Jay. Gloria convinces him to change his mind, so he finds Dylan in the backyard and invites him in, saying he will allow him to take Haley to the party for a few hours. However Dylan would prefer to stay for the family fun of "Jay's Night", so neither of them end up going to the party.

Cameron (Eric Stonestreet) and Mitchell (Jesse Tyler Ferguson) call their party-girl friend, Sal (Elizabeth Banks), for a night on the town but the results of the night are decidedly mixed when Sal starts making some comments about Lily that scare Cam and Mitchell. While trying to figure out why Sal does not like Lily, they realize she is jealous.

The show ends with everyone at Jay's house watching a movie, including a hungover Sal, Dylan eating "Sloppy Jays" (really just Sloppy Joes changed to Jay's name), and Jay asleep in a chair with Luke checking him for a pulse.

== Production ==
The episode was written by Joe Lawson and directed by Jason Winer, his seventh time that season. The episode was dedicated to David Lloyd, father of co-creator Christopher Lloyd who died 8 days before the airdate. At the end it featured an "In Memory" screen dedicating the episode to David's life and quoting the famous line from "Chuckles Bites the Dust", which David wrote: "A little song, a little dance, a little seltzer down your pants."

Edward Norton and Ty Burrell have previously starred together in The Incredible Hulk and Leaves of Grass.

== Reception ==
=== Ratings ===
The episode was viewed by 9.161 million viewers and got a Nielsen rating of 5.4/9.

=== Reviews ===
"Great Expectations" received positive reviews.

Donna Bowman of The A.V. Club gave a B grade to the episode. "There's one thing that "Great Expectations" gets exactly right. Anniversary presents given by spouses to each other suffer from an inevitable asymmetry."

Robert Canning from IGN rated the episode with 9/10 saying that it was another genial snapshot of this clan's life, with laughs coming from the real and the ridiculous. "I do believe I've said this before, but I love the laid-back ease of Modern Family. Nothing ever feels forced, even when it's a hilarious, off-the-wall story involving the bassist from the 80s band Spandau Ballet. Not even halfway through the premiere season, the series has already hit a very comfortable third season groove. [...] "Great Expectations" proved that Modern Family, for all its surface level standard sitcom trappings, can basically tell any style of story it wants to. And hooray for that! Girls' night out, sleepover at Grampa's, '80s synth-pop anniversary gifts—you'll never know what to expect, but it's a darn safe bet that it'll be funny."

The TV Chick wrote that they liked the episode. "I like that this episode, while full of extremely funny moments, also gets to the heart of things. The show is a comedy, but at the core, it is about a family (as crazy, dysfunctional and atypical as it may be)."

Eric Hochberger of TV Fanatic found the episode mediocre and said: "We've said it before, but a mediocre episode of Modern Family was still easily better than any other comedy being offered, so we'll take it."
