= Modern Family season 1 =

Modern Family
- Season 1
- DVD cover
- Starring: Ed O'Neill; Sofía Vergara; Julie Bowen; Ty Burrell; Jesse Tyler Ferguson; Eric Stonestreet; Sarah Hyland; Ariel Winter; Nolan Gould; Rico Rodriguez
- No. of episodes: 24

Release
- Original network: ABC
- Original release: September 23, 2009 – May 19, 2010

Season chronology
- Next → Season 2

The first season of the American television sitcom Modern Family aired on ABC from September 23, 2009 to May 19, 2010.

The season was produced by Lloyd-Levitan Productions in association with 20th Century Fox Television, with series creators Christopher Lloyd and Steven Levitan serving as executive producers. This season was ordered on April 29, 2009.

The series is set in Los Angeles and focuses on the family lives of Jay Pritchett (Ed O'Neill), his daughter Claire Dunphy (Julie Bowen), and his son Mitchell Pritchett (Jesse Tyler Ferguson). Claire is a homemaker mom married to Phil Dunphy (Ty Burrell); they have three children, Haley (Sarah Hyland), the typical teenager, Alex (Ariel Winter), the smart middle child, and Luke (Nolan Gould), the offbeat only son. Jay is married to a much younger Colombian woman, Gloria (Sofía Vergara), and is helping her raise her pre-teen son, Manny (Rico Rodriguez). Mitchell and his partner Cameron Tucker (Eric Stonestreet) have adopted a Vietnamese baby, Lily (twins Ella Hiller and Jaden Hiller).

The season received critical acclaim from most critics, many of whom named it the best new show of 2009. The episode "Fizbo" received overwhelmingly positive reviews from critics, with BuddyTV naming it the second best show of 2009. It was nominated for 14 Emmy Awards; eight Primetime Emmy Awards and six Creative Arts Emmy Awards, the most nominations for a comedy series after Glee and 30 Rock. The series was also a ratings success and the first season averaged 9.39 million viewers for all 24 episodes. The first season DVD and Blu-ray Disc box set was released on September 21, 2010.

== Production ==
=== Conception ===
While working in the office Lloyd and Levitan were telling stories about their family and they thought that could be a show idea, and started working around the idea of a family being observed in a mockumentary style show. They then later decided it would be a show about three families and their experiences. The show was originally called My American Family. Originally, the camera crew would be run by a fictitious Dutch filmmaker named Geert Floortje who had lived with Jay's family as a teenage exchange student. CBS, not ready to use the single-camera style of filming, nor ready to make another large commitment, did not accept the series. NBC, already having two shows of similar style (mockumentary), The Office and Parks and Recreation, decided against accepting the series until the success of the other two series decreases. ABC accepted the series. The series quickly became a priority for ABC after the pilot episode tested high with focus groups, resulting in the network ordering 13 episodes and adding it to the 2009–2010 fall lineup days ahead of ABC's official schedule announcement.

The series was given a full season pickup on October 8, 2009.

=== Crew ===
Lloyd-Levitan Productions and 20th Century Fox Television produced the series during the first season with the show's creators, Christopher Lloyd and Steven Levitan as show runner and executive producer. Lloyd and Levitan previously worked on Frasier, Wings, Just Shoot Me, The Wonder Years. The show's writers include Paul Corrigan, Sameer Gardezi, Joe Lawson, Levitan, Lloyd, Dan O'Shannon, Brad Walsh, Caroline Williams, Bill Wrubel, and Danny Zuker. The season also featured episodes directed by seven different directors. Modern Family featured both a "team of directors" as well as several freelance directors. Jason Winer directed more than half the episodes including both the series premiere and the season finale. Michael Spiller directed two episodes of the first season and went on to direct a majority of the second season. Series co-creator, Steven Levitan, also directed the penultimate episode, "Hawaii". The season also featured two freelance directors, Kevin Sullivan and Reginald Hudlin.

=== Cast ===
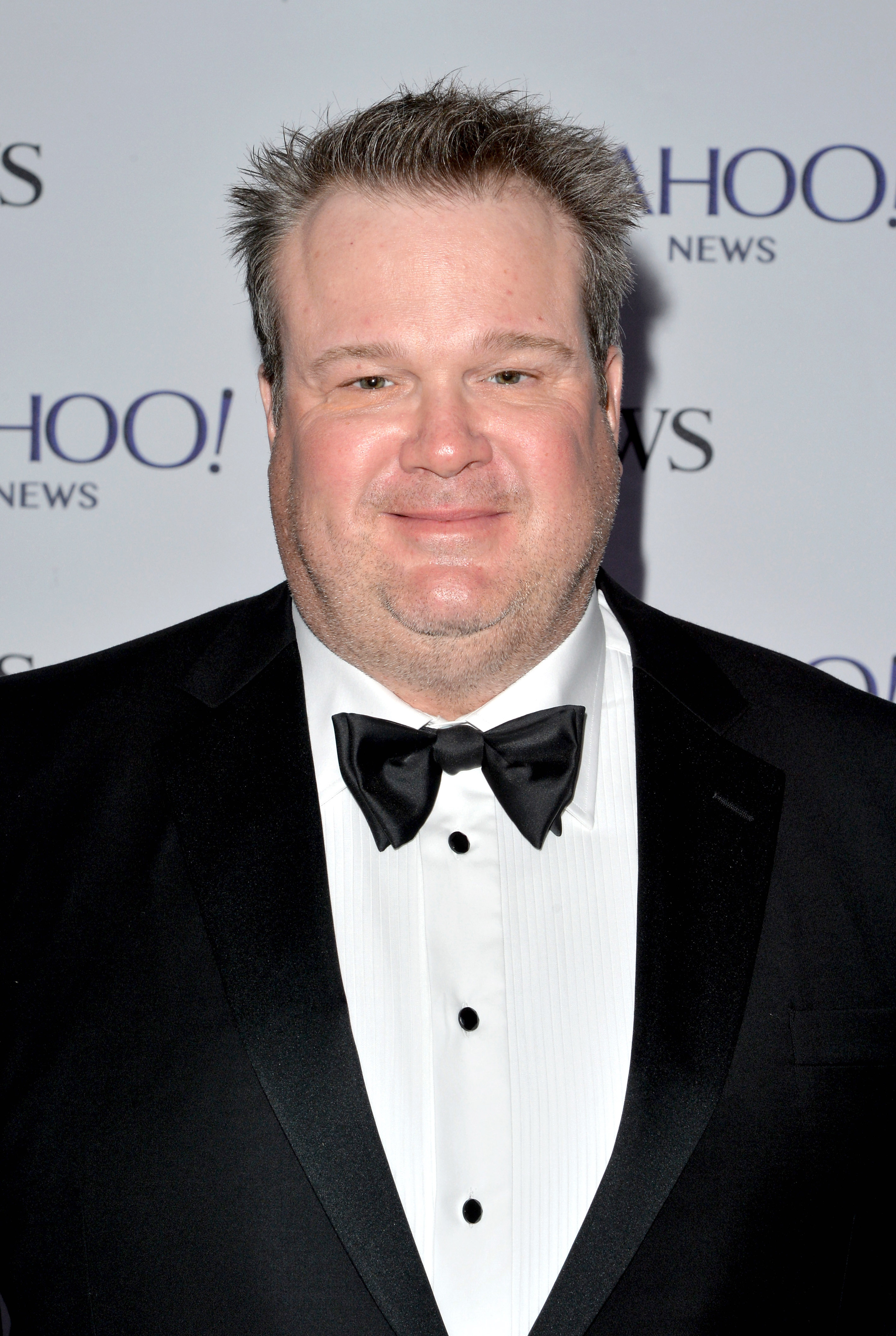
Eric Stonestreet, who portrays Cameron Tucker, received a Primetime Emmy Award for his performance.

Modern Family employs an ensemble cast. The series is set in Los Angeles and focuses on the family lives of Jay Pritchett (Ed O'Neill), his daughter Claire Dunphy (Julie Bowen), and his son Mitchell Pritchett (Jesse Tyler Ferguson). Claire is a homemaker mom married to Phil Dunphy (Ty Burrell); they have three children, Haley (Sarah Hyland), the typical teenager, Alex (Ariel Winter), the smart middle child, and Luke (Nolan Gould), the offbeat only son. Jay is married to a much younger Colombian woman, Gloria (Sofía Vergara), and is helping her raise her pre-teen son, Manny (Rico Rodriguez). Mitchell and his partner Cameron Tucker (Eric Stonestreet) have adopted a Vietnamese baby, Lily (twins Ella Hiller and Jaden Hiller).

O'Neill, who is probably the best known actor of the series, initially lost the part to Craig T. Nelson but was eventually cast after Nelson turned down the role due to financial problems. Production was also difficult for Bowen, who was pregnant with twins while filming the pilot episode. Stonestreet had to try harder for the part of Cameron Tucker, due to him being an unknown actor at the time. Ferguson initially auditioned for the role of Cameron, but the producers thought he was better suited for Mitchell.

The season also featured multiple guest stars. The season featured the first appearance of Fred Willard as Phil's father as Frank Dunphy in two episodes, "Undeck the Halls" and "Travels with Scout". He later went on to be nominated at the 62nd Primetime Emmy Awards for Outstanding Guest Actor in a Comedy Series, but lost to Neil Patrick Harris's performance on Glee. Other guest spots included Elizabeth Banks and Edward Norton who appeared in the eighth episode, "Great Expectations" with both performances receiving positive reviews. Shelley Long appeared in the fourth episode of the season as DeDe Pritchett, Claire and Mitchell's mother and Jay's ex-wife. Many critics gave her casting positive reviews, with Entertainment Weekly writer Michael Slezak calling it a "stroke of genius".

== Episodes ==
No. overall	No. in season	Title	Directed by	Written by	Original release date	Prod. code	U.S. viewers (millions)
1	1	"Pilot"	Jason Winer	Steven Levitan & Christopher Lloyd	September 23, 2009	1ARG79	12.61
Jay's family tries to function despite the age difference between himself and his second wife, Gloria. Claire and Phil try to punish Luke for accidentally shooting Alex with a BB gun and watch over Haley and her new boyfriend Dylan. Claire tells Phil that as punishment for shooting Alex, he has to shoot Luke. He then ends up accidentally shooting Dylan. Mitchell tries to hide from his family that he and his partner Cameron have just adopted a baby daughter, Lily, in Vietnam until Cameron invites Mitchell's family without consulting him (which is revealed to be the other two families, with Jay being Mitchell's father and Claire being Mitchell's older sister).
2	2	"The Bicycle Thief"	Jason Winer	Bill Wrubel	September 30, 2009	1ARG02	9.99
Phil buys his son Luke a new bike despite Claire's doubts about Luke's responsibility. When Phil sees Luke's bike left unattended, he takes it to teach him a lesson but accidentally loses it after helping a neighbor. Panicking, Phil replaces it but later realizes he took another kid's bike by mistake; Claire finds out anyway. Meanwhile, Mitch and Cam take Lily to a toddler playgroup, where Mitch worries about fitting in and asks Cam to tone down his personality. After Mitch becomes concerned about Lily's development, he embarrassingly tries to fake her progress by stealing blocks from another child, an act caught on camera. Mitch wanting to leave due to his own actions, but when another gay couple arrives comfortably being themselves, Mitch apologizes, and Cam’s dance is a big hit with the group. Jay struggles bonding with Manny, especially when Manny eagerly anticipates his absent father's visit. After an accident with a ceiling fan, Manny lashes out emotionally. Later, Jay learns Javier won't come and fabricates a generous excuse to protect Manny’s feelings, when the limo that Jay ordered shows up he says it is there from Javier to take Manny to Disneyland, keeping Manny’s admiration for his dad intact. The story ends humorously as Phil tries returning the stolen bike but is chased away by its young owner and his friend. Note: Sarah Hyland and Ariel Winter did not appear in this episode.
3	3	"Come Fly with Me"	Reginald Hudlin	Dan O'Shannon	October 7, 2009	1ARG04	8.82
Jay tries to spend some time alone with his model airplane, but Phil tags along and Jay flies the plane into his face, which was later revealed to be not as accidental as first thought. Alex and Gloria go to a mall and Gloria tries to convince Alex to wear a dress to a wedding; Mitchell goes to Costco for the first time in his life. Note: Sarah Hyland did not appear in this episode.
4	4	"The Incident"	Jason Winer	Steven Levitan	October 14, 2009	1ARG05	9.35
Mitchell and Claire's mother Dede visits the family months after she embarrassed Jay and Gloria in front of their family during their wedding. Phil and Claire try to judge whether Haley's boyfriend, Dylan, is acceptable to take her to a concert or not. Mitchell goes to his father's house to tell him that they are inviting his ex-wife to a party, but does not tell Gloria. All hell breaks loose when Gloria sees Dede. Dylan then tells them about how his family doesn’t even talk to each other which leads to him singing the song In The Moonlight which is an original song he wrote about Haley. The sexual lyrics lead to Claire and Phil deciding that Haley's not going to the concert. The episode ends with everyone singing the song around their respective homes. Note: Ariel Winter did not appear in this episode.
5	5	"Coal Digger"	Jason Winer	Christopher Lloyd	October 21, 2009	1ARG03	8.66
Manny and Luke get into a fight at school because Manny kept referring to himself as Luke’s uncle. The family gathers at Jay and Gloria's to watch football. Claire and Gloria get into an argument when Luke reveals that Claire has referred to her as a gold digger on numerous occasions but says coal digger. Gloria gets it and storms off to her room. Phil goes to talk to her and try to get her and Claire to makeup. Gloria will only forgive her if she jumps in the pool with her clothes on. Claire does so which leads to everyone but Haley in the pool with their clothes on.
6	6	"Run for Your Wife"	Jason Winer	Paul Corrigan & Brad Walsh	October 28, 2009	1ARG01	9.33
It is the first day of school and Jay and Gloria fight about Manny's outfit. While the kids are at school, Claire wants some quiet time, but Phil has other ideas. Mitchell and Cameron freak out about a minor incident with Lily.
7	7	"En Garde"	Randall Einhorn	Danny Zuker	November 4, 2009	1ARG06	8.77
Manny takes up fencing and he is quite talented. Jay is very proud of Manny, which stirs up resentment in Mitchell. These feelings cause Mitchell to confront Claire about something from their past.
8	8	"Great Expectations"	Jason Winer	Joe Lawson	November 18, 2009	1ARG07	9.16
It is Claire and Phil's anniversary and Jay is having the grandkids over for the night. Meanwhile, Mitchell and Cameron reunite with an old friend.
9	9	"Fizbo"	Jason Winer	Paul Corrigan & Brad Walsh	November 25, 2009	1ARG09	7.15
When Phil and Claire throw a birthday party for Luke, things go wrong and it leads to a trip to the emergency room with a broken arm; Cameron decides to dress up as his clown character Fizbo; Manny has a hard time impressing a girl after taking advice from Jay.
10	10	"Undeck the Halls"	Randall Einhorn	Dan O'Shannon	December 9, 2009	1ARG11	9.67
Claire and Phil threaten to take away Christmas when the kids get in trouble when they see a cigarette burn on the couch. Alex takes the blame so they can have Christmas only for it to be revealed that none of the kids caused the stain to be on the couch. Cameron and Mitchell take Lily to get her first picture with Santa.
11	11	"Up All Night"	Michael Spiller	Christopher Lloyd	January 6, 2010	1ARG10	10.22
Manny's father, Javier (Benjamin Bratt) visits; Phil takes a trip to the hospital. Mitchell and Cameron dispute over a parenting technique.
12	12	"Not in My House"	Chris Koch	Caroline Williams	January 13, 2010	1ARG08	7.83
Gloria hates Jay's life-sized dog butler statue. Claire freaks out when she thinks Luke has been looking at naughty pictures on the computer, but they were actually sent to Phil. Mitchell gets upset at Cameron for helping other people too much. Note: Rico Rodriguez did not appear in this episode.
13	13	"Fifteen Percent"	Jason Winer	Steven Levitan	January 20, 2010	1ARG12	9.83
Mitchell convinces Jay that his friend might be gay. Claire tries to learn how to use the TV remote. Manny has a blind date. Note: Ariel Winter and Nolan Gould did not appear in this episode.
14	14	"Moon Landing"	Jason Winer	Bill Wrubel	February 3, 2010	1ARG13	9.19
Things get a little awkward for Jay and Cameron when they go to the gym. An old friend from work visits Claire. Gloria gets into a minor car accident and Mitchell agrees to be her lawyer.
15	15	"My Funky Valentine"	Michael Spiller	Jerry Collins	February 10, 2010	1ARG16	9.84
Claire and Phil spice things up on Valentine's Day. Mitchell and Cameron help Manny with a bully. Jay and Gloria go to a stand-up comedy show.
16	16	"Fears"	Reginald Hudlin	Steven Levitan	March 3, 2010	1ARG18	8.01
Phil and Luke go into the crawlspace underneath their house. Haley passes her driver's test on her third attempt. Manny tries to get over his fear of roller coasters. Lily says her first word - "Mommy" - which upsets Cameron and Mitchell.
17	17	"Truth Be Told"	Jason Winer	Joe Lawson	March 10, 2010	1ARG17	9.02
Phil invites his ex girlfriend Denise to his house. This leads to Alex tricking Luke into thinking that Denise is there to meet him and that if she likes him, she’ll go live with her after Luke called her a dork to dork salesman. While there, Denise flirts with Phil and tries to get him to sleep with her. Jay accidentally kills Manny's turtle. Mitchell tells his boss the truth.
18	18	"Starry Night"	Jason Winer	Danny Zuker	March 24, 2010	1ARG15	9.18
Claire and Phil take rival approaches to keeping Haley and Luke focused on projects that are due the next day. Manny's ribbing of Mitchell during a trip with Jay causes tension between the three. Cameron tries to make amends with Gloria for past awkward encounters with a night out in her old neighborhood.
19	19	"Game Changer"	Kevin Sullivan	Story by : Vanessa McCarthy & Joe Lawson; Teleplay by : Joe Lawson & Alex Herschlag	March 31, 2010	1ARG21	9.51
iPad release day falls on Phil's birthday, giving Claire an opportunity to finally score an ideal gift for her technophile husband. Manny and Gloria humor Jay, a sore loser at board games, by suppressing their superior chess skills. Mitchell questions his ability to protect his family, while crossed baby monitor signals compel Cameron to secretly intervene in the love life of a neighboring couple.
20	20	"Benched"	Chris Koch	Danny Zuker	April 14, 2010	1ARG20	8.88
Phil and Jay have a series of encounters regarding authority and basketball. Mitchell meets his new boss (Justin Kirk), then he and Cameron accidentally damage his Ferrari. Gloria and Claire's children demand less coddling. Note: Sarah Hyland did not appear in this episode.
21	21	"Travels with Scout"	Seth Gordon	Paul Corrigan & Brad Walsh	April 28, 2010	1ARG14	10.01
Claire is suspicious when Phil's father (Fred Willard) shows up for an unexpected visit. Manny is traumatized by a horror movie. Cam fills the void in Dylan's band for a drummer.
22	22	"Airport 2010"	Jason Winer	Dan O'Shannon & Bill Wrubel	May 5, 2010	1ARG19	9.48
Gloria surprises Jay with a trip to Hawaii for his birthday, but he isn't pleased to find out that the entire family is tagging along and he's paying for it. When everyone arrives at the airport, chaos ensues with forgotten identification, breaches of security, and flying phobias.
23	23	"Hawaii"	Steven Levitan	Paul Corrigan & Brad Walsh	May 12, 2010	1ARG23	10.34
Jay's plans to do nothing but relax on vacation are interrupted by an unwelcome reality check. Meanwhile, Phil tries to make the trip romantic for Claire, Mitchell and Cameron disagree on whether they should go sight-seeing, and the kids get themselves into trouble.
24	24	"Family Portrait"	Jason Winer	Ilana Wernick	May 19, 2010	1ARG22	10.14
Claire makes an effort to take a new family portrait, but everybody is too busy to cooperate: Gloria and Manny go with Phil and Alex to a Lakers game and are seen kissing on the kiss cam and it’s shown on the jumbotron and on TV. Cameron gets a job as a wedding singer while Mitchell takes care of Lily and a stray pigeon, and Luke interviews Jay for a school project.

== Reception ==
=== Ratings ===
The season ranked 21st in the seasonal 18–49 demographic ratings with an average of 3.9 rating/10% share in the demographic meaning that the season was watched by an average of 3.9% of households and 10% average of all televisions were tuned to the season when it was broadcast. The season also ranked 36th in the seasonal total viewers with an average of 9.48 million households. The season became the third highest-rated new series, the second highest-rated new scripted show, and the highest-rated new sitcom that season. The penultimate episode, "Hawaii", was the highest-rated episode of the season with a 4.3 rating/11% share in the Nielsen ratings and at the time was the highest-rated episode of the series. The lowest-rated episode was "Fizbo", which was viewed in 7.12 million households with a 2.4 rating/7% share in the 18–49 demographic. This might have been caused by the episode airing on Thanksgiving Eve. The ratings later went up mid-season despite competition against American Idol with two episodes ("My Funky Valentine" and "Fifteen Percent") tying with the pilot as the second highest-rated episode of the season.

Viewership and ratings per episode of Modern Family season 1
No.	Title	Air date	Rating/share (18–49)	Viewers (millions)	DVR (18–49)	DVR viewers (millions)	Total (18–49)	Total viewers (millions)
1	"Pilot"	September 23, 2009	4.2/11 (16)	12.61 (20)	0.6	1.15	4.8	13.76
2	"The Bicycle Thief"	September 30, 2009	3.8/10	9.99	0.6	1.18	4.4	11.18
3	"Come Fly with Me"	October 7, 2009	3.4/9	8.82	0.7	—N/a	4.1	—N/a
4	"The Incident"	October 14, 2009	3.6/10	9.35	0.8	2.47	4.4	10.64
5	"Coal Digger"	October 21, 2009	3.4/9 (22)	8.66	0.7	—N/a	4.1	—N/a
6	"Run for Your Wife"	October 28, 2009	3.7/9 (13)	9.33	0.8	—N/a	4.5	—N/a
7	"En Garde"	November 4, 2009	3.5/9 (23)	8.77	—N/a	—N/a	—N/a	—N/a
8	"Great Expectations"	November 18, 2009	3.7/10 (15)	9.16	0.8	—N/a	4.5	—N/a
9	"Fizbo"	November 25, 2009	2.4/7	7.15	—N/a	—N/a	—N/a	—N/a
10	"Undeck the Halls"	December 9, 2009	3.8/10 (11)	9.67 (23)	—N/a	—N/a	—N/a	—N/a
11	"Up All Night"	January 6, 2010	4.1/11 (12)	10.22 (24)	—N/a	—N/a	—N/a	—N/a
12	"Not in My House"	January 13, 2010	3.2/8 (24)	7.83	—N/a	—N/a	—N/a	—N/a
13	"Fifteen Percent"	January 20, 2010	4.2/11 (9)	9.83 (21)	—N/a	—N/a	—N/a	—N/a
14	"Moon Landing"	February 3, 2010	3.9/11 (14)	9.19	1.0	—N/a	5.0	—N/a
15	"My Funky Valentine"	February 10, 2010	4.1/10 (13)	9.84 (23)	1.1	—N/a	5.3	—N/a
16	"Fears"	March 3, 2010	3.5/9 (20)	8.01	1.2	—N/a	4.6	—N/a
17	"Truth Be Told"	March 10, 2010	3.7/10	9.02	—N/a	—N/a	—N/a	—N/a
18	"Starry Night"	March 24, 2010	3.7/10 (13)	9.18 (22)	1.2	—N/a	4.9	—N/a
19	"Game Changer"	March 31, 2010	3.9/11 (8)	9.51 (20)	1.1	—N/a	5.0	—N/a
20	"Benched"	April 14, 2010	3.7/10 (10)	8.88 (23)	—N/a	—N/a	—N/a	—N/a
21	"Travels with Scout"	April 28, 2010	4.2/12 (6)	10.01 (19)	—N/a	—N/a	—N/a	—N/a
22	"Airport 2010"	May 5, 2010	3.9/11 (9)	9.48	—N/a	—N/a	—N/a	—N/a
23	"Hawaii"	May 12, 2010	4.3/12 (6)	10.34 (23)	—N/a	—N/a	—N/a	—N/a
24	"Family Portrait"	May 19, 2010	4.2/12	10.14	2.6	—N/a	5.5	—N/a

=== Reviews ===
There was nothing cynical about this series, and the fact that happy endings concluded many of the episodes was warm and inviting, not groan-inducing. Simply put, Modern Family was one of the best new comedies of the season.

— Robert Canning
IGN

The first season has been met with unanimous positive reviews. It received a 'critically acclaimed' Metacritic score of 86 out of 100. Entertainment Weekly gave it an A−, calling it "...immediately recognizable as the best new sitcom of the fall..." In Time's review the show was named "the funniest new family comedy of the year." It has also been compared to the 1970s series Soap, in regards to the multiple family aspect, as well as Arrested Development. Some have made comparisons to The Office and Parks and Recreation, due to their mockumentary formats. BuddyTV named the show the second best show in 2009 saying "Every actor is fantastic, every family is interesting, and unlike many shows, there isn't a weak link."

Robert Canning of IGN gave the season an 8.9 saying it was "Great" and called it "Simply put, Modern Family was one of the best new comedies of the season." He also praised the ensemble cast and the characters calling them lovable. Jason Hughes of TV Squad named the show along with ABC Comedy Wednesday (The Middle and Cougar Town) as one of the best shows of 2009. TV Squad writer Allison Waldman called the series "overrated" saying "it's disconnected and uneven" and "The hokey, voice-over narrations at the end of most shows is toe-curling.". It was also named the Best Sitcom of the TV Season by BuddyTV reviewer John Kubicek. He also stated "A killer cast and the funniest and smartest writing TV has seen in a long time helped make this freshman comedy not only the funniest show on TV, but also the best." A poll by the Los Angeles Times said Modern Family is to win Primetime Emmy Award for Outstanding Comedy Series and beat three year in a row winner 30 Rock. Ken Tucker of Entertainment Weekly ranked the season the third best series of 2009, praising it for finding its tone so fast.

"Fizbo" received positive reviews from critics with many naming it the best episode of the season. It ranked number 27th on BuddyTV list of top 50 best episodes of 2009 calling it a "perfect ensemble piece". Robert Canning of IGN said that the episode "continued its trend of outstanding episodes", while The A.V. Club writer named the episode "best episode since the first couple [of episodes]". Nolan Gould, who plays Luke Dunphy, considers it his favorite episode of the series. The episode was later nominated for Primetime Emmy Award for Outstanding Supporting Actor in a Comedy Series for Eric Stonestreet's performance as Cameron Tucker and later won.

Modern Family drew criticism from some quarters for its portrayal of Cameron and Mitchell as not being physically affectionate with each other. The criticism spawned a Facebook campaign to demand Mitchell and Cameron be allowed to kiss. In response to the controversy, producers released a statement that a season two episode would address Mitchell's discomfort with public displays of affection. Executive producer Levitan has said that it was unfortunate that the issue had arisen, since the show's writers had always planned on such a scene "as part of the natural development of the show." The episode, "The Kiss" eventually aired and drew praise from multiple critics for the subtle nature of the kiss and became the fourth highest-rated episode of the series so far.

=== Awards and nominations ===
The series has been nominated for numerous awards, of which 10 were won. The first of which were Best Episodic Comedy for the "pilot episode" tying with 30 Rocks Robert Carlock for his work on "Apollo, Apollo" and New Series at the Writers Guild of America Awards 2009. The pilot episode also won Outstanding Directorial Achievement in Comedy Series for the "Pilot" and also at the Young Artist Awards for Outstanding Comedy Series. The season also received a Peabody Award. The show was later nominated for 14 Primetime Emmy Awards, the third most Emmy nominations for a comedy series for 2009 after Glee and 30 Rock. The season later won 6 of the 14 Emmy nominations including Primetime Emmy Award for Outstanding Comedy Series. The season is currently nominated for Outstanding Directing for a Comedy Series for series co-creator Steven Levitan's work on the penultimate episode, "Hawaii".

== Home Media Release ==
The first season of Modern Family was released on DVD in a four-disc set and Blu-ray in a three-disc set on September 21, 2010. The box-sets contains all 24 episodes and include Deleted Family Interviews, Deleted and Extended Scenes, the behind-the-scenes making of the final episodes of the season, a look at the main cast roles' before Modern Family and more.

Modern Family: The Complete First Season
Set Details		Special Features
24 episodes; 4-disc set (DVD); 3-disc set (Blu-ray); 1.78:1 aspect ratio; English (Dolby Digital 5.1) (DVD); English (DTS-HD Master Audio 5.1) (Blu-ray); Subtitles: English, French, Spanish, Portuguese, Cantonese; Runtime: 514 minutes		Deleted, Extended & Alternate Scenes; Deleted Family Interviews; Gag Reel; Real Modern Family Moments; Before Modern Family; Fizbo The Clown; The Making of Modern Family: "Family Portrait"; Modern Family "Hawaii"
Release Dates
Region 1	Region 2	Region 4
September 21, 2010	October 4, 2010	October 8, 2010
