= Not in My House =

- Modern Family episode
- Jay (Ed O'Neill) brings Barkley to Cam (Eric Stonestreet) and Mitch (Jesse Tyler Ferguson)
- Episode no.: Season 1 Episode 12
- Directed by: Chris Koch
- Written by: Caroline Williams
- Production code: 1ARG08
- Original air date: January 13, 2010

Episode chronology
← Previous "Up All Night"	Next → "Fifteen Percent"
- Modern Family season 1

"Not in My House" is the twelfth episode of the first season of the American family sitcom television series Modern Family and the twelfth episode of the series overall. It premiered on ABC on January 13, 2010. The episode was written by Caroline Williams and directed by Chris Koch.

In the episode, Claire finds a photo of a topless woman on her computer and believes that it is Luke's, while in reality is Phil's. Haley believes that Alex has read her journal and the two girls fight, while Luke was the one who did it. Jay buys a statue of a dog dressed as a butler and brings it home, but Gloria does not like it at all. Mitchell and Cameron try to help their Spanish gardener who seems upset but the lack of understanding his language, causes confusion.

The episode got a Nielsen rating of 3.2/8 in the 18-49 demographic. Ratings fell around 2 million viewers from the previous episode, a drop attributed to heavy competition from the season premiere of American Idol. It received mixed reviews from television critics.

== Plot ==
Claire (Julie Bowen) discovers a photo on her computer of a topless woman on a tractor, and she assumes that Luke (Nolan Gould) downloaded it since he is the last one who used her computer. Phil (Ty Burrell) tries to hide that he owns the photo because he believes that Claire will be mad at him and lets her believe that the photo indeed belongs to Luke. He says that it would be better to let him handle it and he will talk to Luke.

Haley (Sarah Hyland) believes Alex (Ariel Winter) has read her journal and they get into a fight. Luke is the one who actually did it and he talks about it to Claire. Claire misunderstands what Luke is trying to confess and she thinks that he is talking about the image with the naked woman she found on her computer. Eventually the truth of whose the picture is, is revealed.

Jay (Ed O'Neill) brought home a statue of a dog dressed as a butler and named it Barkley. Gloria (Sofía Vergara) is spooked by it and she wants it out of the house. She removes it to the guest room so she will not have to see it every time she enters the house but Jay brings it back. He ends up giving it to Mitchell (Jesse Tyler Ferguson) and Cam (Eric Stonestreet).

Meanwhile, Cam and Mitchell try to help their gardener who seems sad but their inability to speak Spanish causes much confusion. At the end, Cam finds out that the gardener was just stressed because of his wedding and the whole family ends up in their home for the ceremony.

== Reception ==
=== Ratings ===
In its original American broadcast, "Not in My House" was viewed by 7.847 million viewers. The drop in viewership is most likely attributed to the episode airing against the second night of the season premiere of American Idol.

=== Reviews ===
"Not in My House" received mixed reviews.

The episode was well received by Robert Canning of IGN who gave it an 8.5/10 saying that "It was smart and subtle and had you smiling joyfully at the goings on, if not laughing out loud for 30 minutes straight."

Jason Hughes of TV Squad said that "this may have been one of the funniest episodes of Modern Family yet".

James Poniewozik of Time Magazine said it was not the best but good saying that "Fair's fair; last night's episode, which kept the three storylines largely separate, wasn't as strong, But it wasn't because the families were separate or because the stories weren't thematically connected".

Emily VanDerWerff of The A.V. Club gave the episode a B+ with readers giving it a B saying that "Modern Family started out with one of the best pilots I've ever seen. [...] But I'm not entirely sure that the show will be anywhere near my list of favorites by the time, say, season three rolls around. I'd love to be proved wrong, and the way the show has kept up the level of quality this season suggests I will be proved wrong, but at the same time, the show is a solid, out-of-the-box hit with a dedicated audience that loves the shit out of it."
