= Undeck the Halls =

- Modern Family episode
- Episode no.: Season 1 Episode 10
- Directed by: Randall Einhorn
- Written by: Dan O'Shannon
- Production code: 1ARG11
- Original air date: December 9, 2009

Guest appearances
- Brian T. Finney as Scott; Jeremy Scott Johnson as Andrew; The Greg Wilson as Head Elf; Fred Willard as Frank Dunphy

Episode chronology
← Previous "Fizbo"	Next → "Up All Night"
- Modern Family season 1

"Undeck the Halls" is the tenth episode of the first season of the American family sitcom television series Modern Family and the tenth episode of the series overall. It premiered on ABC in the United States on December 9, 2009. The episode was written by Dan O'Shannon and directed by Randall Einhorn. Fred Willard guest stars as Phil's dad, Frank Dunphy.

In the episode, Claire and Phil threaten to take away Christmas when they discover that one of the kids tried a cigarette but none wants to admit it. Alex takes the blame to save Christmas but it is revealed that they were all saying the truth from the start. Cameron and Mitchell take Lily to get her first picture with Santa at the Mall, but they complain to the management that Santa is not jolly enough for the kids, leads to Santa losing his job. Jay wants to introduce Manny and Gloria to some Christmas traditions while they want to do the same to Jay with Colombian Christmas traditions.

The episode received positive reviews from critics and had a 3.8. in the 18–49 demographic.

== Plot ==
While Claire (Julie Bowen), Phil (Ty Burrell) and the kids talk to Phil's dad, Frank (Fred Willard) via video chat to wish him Merry Christmas, Claire discovers a burn mark on the arm of the couch. Seeing that, they get to the conclusion that one of the kids was smoking a cigarette and they ask them to say who did it. When none of the kids admit the truth, Phil reacts in an extreme manner and threatens to cancel Christmas, taking the tree away until someone confesses.

Despite the dismay of Claire and the kids, Phil stands his ground. Alex (Ariel Winter), seeing that Phil is serious about taking away the Christmas tree, admits that she was the one who tried to smoke. Phil brings back the Christmas tree and Claire says that Alex is grounded for a whole week, starting December 26 so she will not miss the Christmas day but will miss New Years. While they are celebrating, they discover that the burn mark on the couch was caused by the refracting sunlight through a Christmas ornament that Frank sent them. When they ask Alex why she lied, she says that she did not want Phil to take away the Christmas so she chose to take the blame. Christmas is back on, although when the kids reminds Phil he blamed them and threatened to cancel Christmas for something they didn't do, he impulsively promises to take the family to Italy.

Jay (Ed O'Neill) tries to introduce Manny (Rico Rodriguez) and Gloria (Sofía Vergara) to some Pritchett Christmas traditions such as watching Miracle on 34th Street. Gloria and Manny though want to incorporate some of their country's traditions associated with Day of the Holy Innocents such as jokes and fireworks. Jay initially does not react well but at the end he realizes that they can have both American and Colombian traditions together.

Meanwhile, Cameron (Eric Stonestreet) and Mitchell (Jesse Tyler Ferguson) take Lily (Ella Hiller) to the mall to take her first picture with Santa (Brian T. Finney). When their turn for the photo comes, they do not find the Santa big enough. They complain to management about it and the guy who portrays the Santa gets fired. Feeling guilty about what they have done, they take Santa home to share a dinner with him. Although uneasy at first, especially since they got him fired, things work out and it is revealed that he knew about their getting him fired. Leaving Cam and Mitchell's house, Santa punches a carol singer who usurped Cameron from his a cappella group that showed up to their house to spite Cameron.

== Reception ==
=== Ratings ===
In its original American broadcast, "Undeck the Halls" was viewed by an estimated 9.666 million households and received a 3.8 rating/10% share in the 18-49 demographic with a 5.6 rating/6% share Nielsen rating in the Nielsen Media Research. "Undeck the Halls" finished 23rd place in the weekly ratings with. The episode was the 6th highest rated show on ABC in overall viewership for the week, and was second in the 18-49 ratings for the week (following the Disney special Prep and Landing).

=== Reviews ===
"Undeck the Halls" received positive reviews.

Robert Canning gave it an 8.6/10 saying it "set the bar for hopefully many more Christmas episodes to come" saying the most fun came from Cameron and Mitchell's subplot and says he looks forward to more Christmas episodes.

Jason Hughes of TV Squad stated in his review "This holiday episode was lighter on the funny moments than most episodes of Modern Family, which isn't to say that it wasn't plenty funny. It substituted those with more heartfelt moments.". He also stated the best moment of the episode was when Jay surprised Gloria and Manny with fireworks.

TV Fanatic gave the episode a positive review saying "The episode might not have been as funny as previous installments, but it certainly had some very sweet heart, especially when it came to Jay's storyline." But the episode was criticised for not featuring Fred Willard, saying "Fred Willard is comedic genius and could have added a lot to the already amazing Modern Family cast, but was for some odd reason underused."
