= Fizbo =

- Modern Family episode
- Eric Stonestreet as Fizbo
- Episode no.: Season 1 Episode 9
- Directed by: Jason Winer
- Written by: Brad Walsh; Paul Corrigan
- Production code: 1ARG09
- Original air date: November 25, 2009

Guest appearances
- Reid Ewing as Dylan; Margo Harshman as Jungle Tanya; Stacey Hinnen as Guy at the gas station; Kaitlyn Dever as Bianca Douglas

Episode chronology
| ← Previous "Great Expectations" | Next → "Undeck the Halls" |
- Modern Family season 1

"Fizbo" is the ninth episode of the first season of the American family sitcom television series Modern Family and the ninth episode of the series overall. It originally aired on ABC in the United States on November 25, 2009. The episode was written by Brad Walsh & Paul Corrigan and directed by Jason Winer.

In the episode, Phil and Claire try to throw a party for Luke's birthday. Cameron decides to dress up as his clown character Fizbo to attend the party. Manny has a hard time impressing a girl after taking advice from Jay. Haley gets jealous when Dylan talks to the animal handler of the party and ignores her in the process. Everything seems to go fine, but after Haley frees a scorpion from its cage, things go wrong and the family ends up going to the emergency room.

"Fizbo" has received positive reviews from critics with many naming it the best episode up to that point. Despite this, "Fizbo" was viewed in 7.12 million households when it premiered, becoming the lowest rated episode of the series. Ratings analysts attributed Fizbo’s low ratings to the episode airing the night before Thanksgiving.

Eric Stonestreet won the Primetime Emmy Award for Outstanding Supporting Actor in a Comedy Series for his performance in this episode.

== Plot ==
It is Luke's (Nolan Gould) birthday and Phil (Ty Burrell) and Claire (Julie Bowen) want to throw a big birthday party for him. Phil is the one who organizes things for the party. Among other things he ordered, he also asks for an animal handler, Jungle Tanya (Margo Harshman), who brings different animals to show them to the kids, including iguanas, a python and a scorpion. Claire sets up a comb sheath making stand but Phil says that it will be boring.

Manny (Rico Rodriguez) wants to impress a girl he likes from school, Bianca (Kaitlyn Dever), and she is going to be at Luke's birthday party. He does not know what to do to get her attention and he asks for Jay's (Ed O'Neill) advice. Jay tells him that girls go for power and success and since he does not have any of those, he should be the funny guy. Manny's attempts to be funny do not have much of success.

Cameron (Eric Stonestreet) dresses up as Fizbo the clown, despite Mitchell's (Jesse Tyler Ferguson) disagreement. But Cameron believes that there cannot be a party without a clown so he ignores him. On their way to the party though, Cameron defends Mitchell at the gas station, and Mitchell sees him in a different way. When they arrive at the party, it turns out Phil is afraid of clowns.

Haley's (Sarah Hyland) boyfriend Dylan (Reid Ewing) is also at the party. When Dylan starts talking with Jungle Tanya ignoring Haley, Haley gets jealous and she frees the scorpion from its box to take her revenge.

Everything is going well at the party until the moment the freed scorpion triggers a chain of events and the whole family ends up in the hospital because Luke slipped on some beads from Claire's comb sheath stand and broke his arm. During the chaos, Manny saves Bianca from a collapsing bouncy house, impressing her. While everyone is worried, Luke seems really happy for having a cast because he always wanted one and he says that this was the best birthday party ever.

== Production ==
The episode was written by Brad Walsh & Paul Corrigan and directed by the series' main director, Jason Winer. The episode employs a framing device to tell the story. The episode was inspired by the fact that Eric Stonestreet actually used to perform as a clown; Fizbo was a nickname that his dad gave him. Fizbo's clothing is Stonestreet's real clown clothes. During an interview with Jesse Tyler Ferguson in a January 13, 2026 interview on Ferguson’s video series, "Dinner’s On Me with Jesse Tyler Ferguson", Eric Stonestreet revealed that he both developed and applied the makeup on set for each of his appearances as Fizbo throughout the series.

== Reception ==
=== Ratings ===
In its original American broadcast, "Fizbo" was viewed in 7.12 million households with a 2.4 rating/7% share in the 18-49 demographic becoming the lowest rated episode in the series history, until the Season 7 finale, due to the fact it aired Thanksgiving Eve. The show came fourth in its timeslot losing to Criminal Minds, The Biggest Loser, and Glee according to Nielsen Media Research.

=== Reviews ===
The episode was critically acclaimed, with many reviewers naming it the best episode of the season.

Although it was the least viewed episode of the season, it was the highest rated on IGN with a rating of 9.3. IGN reviewer Robert Canning noted, "Modern Family continued its trend of outstanding episodes."

BuddyTV named the episode the 26th best episode of 2009 saying "A perfect ensemble piece had the family gather for a disastrous birthday party that featured a clown, a crossbow, a scorpion, a bouncy castle, a zip line and beads".

Donna Bowman of The A.V. Club gave the episode an A saying "Best birthday ever. And best episode since the first couple. Welcome back, Modern Family!"

Robert Canning in a review of the season remarked "the episode perhaps being that moment when the series went from being a strong freshman series to a breakaway critical success."

James Poniewozik of Time gave the episode a positive review calling it "an impeccably executed pile-up of comic misfortune" and also said "Besides playing well of the defining traits of several characters, . . . it also proved again that the show has a great touch for physical comedy."

M.L. House of TV Fanatic named the episode the best episode of the season saying "This episode also brought all storylines and family members together in an ideal conclusion to the half hour".

Chris "Boomer" Beachum and Rob Licuria of Los Angeles Times stated Eric Stonestreet has the best chance to win a Primetime Emmy Award for his performance in the episode.

=== Awards ===
Eric Stonestreet won the Primetime Emmy Award for Outstanding Supporting Actor in a Comedy Series for his performance as Fizbo in this episode.
