= Day of the Holy Innocents =

Christian observance

- Official name: Día de los Santos Inocentes
- Observed by: Spain, Hispanic America, Philippines
- Type: Religious and Cultural
- Significance: Commemoration of the Massacre of the Innocents; equivalent to April Fools' Day
- Celebrations: Pranks (inocentadas), fake news, religious services
- Date: December 28

The Day of the Holy Innocents (Spanish: Día de los Santos Inocentes) is a tradition celebrated on December 28 in Spain, Hispanic America, and the Philippines. While its origins are religious, based on the biblical account of the Massacre of the Innocents by Herod the Great, it has evolved into a popular secular custom of playing practical jokes, similar to April Fools' Day.

== Religious origin ==
The day commemorates the victims of the Massacre of the Innocents, the young male children of Bethlehem whom King Herod ordered to be killed in an attempt to eliminate the infant Jesus, as described in the Gospel of Matthew. In the Roman Rite of the Catholic Church, the day is classified as a Feast.

== Popular customs ==
In Spanish-speaking cultures, the tradition of playing pranks (known as inocentadas) is the central feature of the day.

=== Pranks and practical jokes ===
Common pranks include changing sugar for salt, placing paper cutouts (often in the shape of a person, called a monigote) on people's backs, or telling elaborate fake stories to friends and family. When a person is successfully fooled, the prankster traditionally shouts: "¡Inocente, inocente!" (Innocent, innocent!) or recites the verse "Inocente palomita que te dejaste engañar" (Innocent little dove that let yourself be fooled).

=== Media involvement ===
Similar to April first in the English-speaking world, major newspapers, radio stations, and television channels in Colombia, Spain, and Mexico often publish or broadcast "fake news" stories. These stories are usually retracted the following day or revealed as jokes at the end of the segment.

=== Borrowing tradition ===
A traditional, though declining, custom involves borrowing objects or money from friends on December 28. According to the "rules" of the day, the borrower is not strictly obligated to return the item, as the lender is considered "innocent" for trusting someone on this specific date.

== Regional variations ==
- Colombia: it is common for news networks to air year-end blooper reels (los descaches) of their presenters. In Pasto, the day marks the start of the Blacks and Whites' Carnival with the Arcoíris en el Asfalto (Rainbow on the Asphalt) event, where people draw in the streets with chalk.
- Spain: In Ibi, Spain, the festival of Els Enfarinats is celebrated, involving a mock battle with flour and eggs.
- Venezuela: known as the Fiesta de los Locos (Festival of the Crazies) in some regions, where participants dress in colorful costumes and masks.

== In popular culture ==
- The tradition is featured in the Modern Family season 1 episode "Undeck the Halls" where Jay is tricked into watching a distorted "joke copy" of the film Miracle on 34th Street.
- The tradition is mentioned in Chapter 4 of the video game Reverse: 1999.

== See also ==
- April Fools' Day
- Childermas
- Massacre of the Innocents
