= Fear of roller coasters =

Phobia of roller coaster rides

Fear of roller coasters, also known as veloxrotaphobia, is the extreme fear of roller coasters. It can also be informally referred to as coaster-phobia.

Such a fear is thought to originate from one or more of three factors: childhood trauma, fear of heights, and parental fears that "rub off" on their children. In addition, veloxrotaphobia may be intensified by underlying fears such as claustrophobia and illygnophobia.

== Incidence ==
The enjoyment of roller coasters has been likened to a form of benign masochism. According to Rajvi Desai, "For something to be deemed benign masochism, the activity at hand needs to incite so little negative emotion as to be tolerable; if the negative emotion reaches or surpasses into intolerable, it won't be worthy of being indulged in." However, for those with veloxrotaphobia, roller coasters release high doses of the stress hormone cortisol, which may cause elevated heart rate, sweating, feeling faint, uncontrollable shaking, trembling, and tingling, fast breathing, and chest pain.

It is estimated that about five percent of the world's population suffers from an extreme fear of heights, however, no exact data has been published on what percent of people are afraid of roller coasters.

It is believed that individuals with lower natural levels of dopamine are more prone to being fearful of roller coasters.

== Remedies ==
The fear of roller coasters is a relatively common fear. It can be treated effectively through exposure therapy, in which the subject learns to disassociate roller coasters with the unlikely possibility of danger. The use of virtual reality headsets in providing a remedy for those with the fear has also been suggested.

Riders are also encouraged to familiarize themselves with statistics on roller coaster safety. For example, according to the International Association of Amusement Parks and Attractions, there is a 1 in 750 million chance of suffering a fatal injury on a fixed-location roller coaster.

== See also ==
- Acrophobia
- Amusement park accidents
- Fear of falling
- List of phobias
