= Pilot (Modern Family) =

- Modern Family episode
- Episode no.: Season 1 Episode 1
- Directed by: Jason Winer
- Written by: Steven Levitan; Christopher Lloyd
- Cinematography by: David Hennings
- Editing by: Ryan Case
- Production code: 1ARG79
- Original air date: September 23, 2009

Guest appearances
- Matt Corboy as Josh; Jenica Bergere as Soccer Mom; Reid Ewing as Dylan

Episode chronology
← Previous —	Next → "The Bicycle Thief"
- Modern Family season 1

"Pilot" is the first episode of the American family sitcom television series Modern Family. Written by series creators Steven Levitan and Christopher Lloyd and directed by Jason Winer, it premiered on the American Broadcasting Company (ABC) in the United States on September 23, 2009. The episode introduces viewers to three sets of people who make up a single family. The episode is shot in a mockumentary style, with a cameraman following the characters around their everyday lives and interviewing them at various intervals. It cuts between the experiences of the three separate units before they all come together at the end of the episode.

In the episode, Jay's family tries to function despite the age difference between himself and his second wife, Gloria. Claire and Phil try to punish their son and watch over their elder daughter and her new boyfriend. Mitchell tries to hide the fact that he and his partner Cameron have adopted a daughter in Vietnam from his family until Cameron invites Mitchell's family without consulting him (which is revealed to be the other two families). Reviews for the pilot episode compared Modern Family to shows such as Married... with Children (which starred Ed O'Neill), Frasier (which the creators of Modern Family worked on), Malcolm in the Middle and, most strongly, Arrested Development. In the United Kingdom, reviewers saw similarities between Modern Family and Outnumbered. The episode has received multiple nominations and has won Episodic Comedy at the Writers Guild of America Awards 2009 and also a Primetime Emmy Award for Outstanding Writing for a Comedy Series.

== Plot ==
The series begins at the home of Phil and Claire Dunphy and their three children: Haley, Alex, and Luke. Claire tells Haley that her skirt is too short, but Phil allows her to wear it. In side interviews, Phil calls himself a "cool dad", while Claire wants to prevent her children from making the same mistakes she did when she was growing up. Alex complains that Luke shot her with the toy gun Phil bought him. Claire forces Phil to follow through on his deal with Luke: if Luke shoots someone, Phil will have to shoot him.

Gloria Delgado-Pritchett and her husband, Jay, are watching Gloria's son Manny play soccer. An overenthusiastic Gloria shouts encouragement to her son and argues with another parent. Gloria and Jay are then interviewed, where Gloria discusses the differences between their backgrounds; she comes from a small village in Colombia that is "number one for murders", while he comes from the city and owns a big business. Back on the pitch, Manny misses a goal when he spots a beautiful sixteen-year-old girl riding by on a bicycle. Gloria speaks to the father of one of the other players, who assumes that Jay is her dad.

The scene shifts to Mitchell and Cameron, a gay couple who are on a plane returning from Vietnam after having adopted a baby, Lily. The other passengers admire Lily, with one man commenting, "You and your wife must be thrilled". When Cameron walks on board and sits down beside Mitchell, an uneasy silence develops. In their interview, Mitchell and Cameron say that they have been together for five years. Back on the plane, Mitchell threatens to make a speech and does so when a woman says "look at that baby with those cream puffs", which he believes is a reference to him and Cameron. In fact, she is referring to the cream puffs Lily is holding. Cameron apologizes by offering to pay for headsets for all the passengers.

Back at the Dunphy residence, Haley has invited Dylan over, a senior boy from her high school. Claire instructs Phil to "scare him", but Phil hurts his back in the process, and Dylan is forced to carry Phil to the couch. Haley brings her boyfriend upstairs and grows annoyed when Claire constantly checks on them. Haley goes downstairs to complain to Phil, who is preparing to shoot Luke against his will. Phil though, accidentally shoots Luke, Dylan, and then himself.

After the soccer game, Jay is mistaken for a mall walker so he decides to buy some 'hip' new clothes. Meanwhile, Manny reads a poem to the sixteen-year-old and is crushed when she says she has a boyfriend.

The last scene is at Mitchell and Cameron's house where Lily is going to be introduced to the rest of the family and it's revealed for the first time that all the characters are related; Jay is Mitchell & Claire's father. Before Lily is introduced, Jay, who is unsure if Mitchell and Cameron are ready for fatherhood, suggests that if they are bored, they should get a dog. Cameron enters, holding Lily aloft before the family while "Circle of Life" from The Lion King plays. Eventually, the whole family accepts the adoption and welcomes Lily as part of their family.

== Production ==
=== Conception ===
While working in the office Lloyd and Levitan were telling stories about their family and they thought that could be a show idea, and started working with the concept of families being observed in a mockumentary style show. They then later decided it would be a show about three families and their experiences. The show was originally called My American Family. Originally, the camera crew would be run by a fictitious Dutch filmmaker named Geert Floortje who had lived with Jay's family as a teenage exchange student and developed a crush on Claire (while Mitchell had a crush on him), but decided against it. The creators pitched it to three of the four major networks (they did not pitch it to Fox due to problems Lloyd had with the network with previous shows). CBS, not ready to use the single-camera style of filming, nor ready to make another large commitment, did not accept the series. NBC, already having two shows of similar style (mockumentary), The Office and Parks and Recreation, decided against accepting the series until the success of the other two series decreased. ABC accepted the series. The series was given a full season pickup on October 8, 2009. On January 12, 2010, ABC Entertainment President Stephen McPherson announced that Modern Family had been renewed for a second season.

=== Casting ===
Casting for Modern Family was very difficult (except for Jesse Tyler Ferguson). Initially Ed O'Neill had lost the part to Craig T. Nelson (who would later go on to play Zeek Braverman on Parenthood on NBC) although he was eventually cast after Nelson turned down the part, as he was not satisfied with the amount of money being offered for the role. Eric Stonestreet who was unknown at the time had to fight for the role of Cameron. It was also difficult for Julie Bowen as she was pregnant with twins during filming and had to cover her pregnant belly with clothes, pillows, laundry baskets etc. while Ty Burrell had to test for the role of Phil Dunphy three times. Initially the role of Phil Dunphy was offered to Matt LeBlanc who turned it down as he feel it would be a bad fit for him. Initially Jesse Tyler Ferguson had auditioned for the role of Cameron before Christopher Lloyd and Steven Levitan thought he would be better suited for the role of Mitchell.

=== Filming ===
The episode was filmed in Los Angeles in the United States and is set in a nameless suburban neighborhood. It was written and produced by Christopher Lloyd and Steven Levitan, who had worked together on Frasier. When Julie Bowen, who plays Claire Dunphy, read the script, she "desperately wanted to do it" but was pregnant with twins. Bowen "auditioned, begged and pleaded", eventually convincing the show makers to film around her stomach. In the pilot, shot when Bowen was 8½ months pregnant, Bowen hides her stomach with laundry. When Phil was dancing to the High School Musical song it was very difficult for the child actors not to laugh with everyone laughing when they had finished filming the scene.

== Reception ==
=== Ratings ===
The episode premiered on ABC in the United States on September 23, 2009. The show was watched live by 12.61 million viewers, placing it as the most viewed show of the night and the series. It also acquired a Nielsen rating of 4.2/11 in the 18-49 age bracket. The show began broadcasting in the United Kingdom on Sky1 on 15 October 2009. The pilot was watched by 444,000 viewers across two airings, with 348,000 watching the show in the 8pm time slot.

=== Reviews ===
The pilot episode received universal acclaim, with some reviewers highlighting it as one of the best new comedies of 2009. Robert Canning of IGN gave the episode an 8.8 saying it was "Great" and "The premiere episode does a fantastic job of introducing us to these family units, and it was fun to see how they would be connected to each other in the realm of the series. The smaller issues aside - the mildly unclear format, some forced clichés - the pilot episode of Modern Family is a must see comedy". Variety wrote "Easily the new season's best comedy pilot, Modern Family deftly serves up laughs on multiple levels, from understated one-liners to deft sight-gags." Mary McNamara of the LA Times commented "Just when we were thinking it couldn't be done, ABC's Modern Family has single-handedly brought the family comedy back from the dead...Modern Family is sharp, timely and fresh, complicated enough to be interesting but with a soft, sweet center". The New York Times' Gina Bellafante called the series "the best new half-hour of funny television in a season rife with half-hours of funny television". She also felt it was a replacement for Arrested Development, the "last great family comedy" which ended in 2006. The success of the pilot led to the series holding a rating of 86/100 on Metacritic from 25 reviews. ABC ordered a full 22-episode season of the show.

=== Awards and nominations ===
The episode received multiple award nominations. The episode's director Jason Winer won Directors Guild of America award for Directors Guild of America Award for Outstanding Directing – Comedy Series. The episode also won for Episodic Comedy at the Writers Guild of America Awards 2009 tying with Robert Carlock for his work on a 30 Rock episode: "Apollo, Apollo". The episode was also nominated for numerous Primetime Emmy Awards winning Outstanding Writing for a Comedy Series and Outstanding Single-Camera Picture Editing for a Comedy Series, but lost Outstanding Directing for a Comedy Series to Glee.
