= Reid Ewing =

American actor (born 1988)

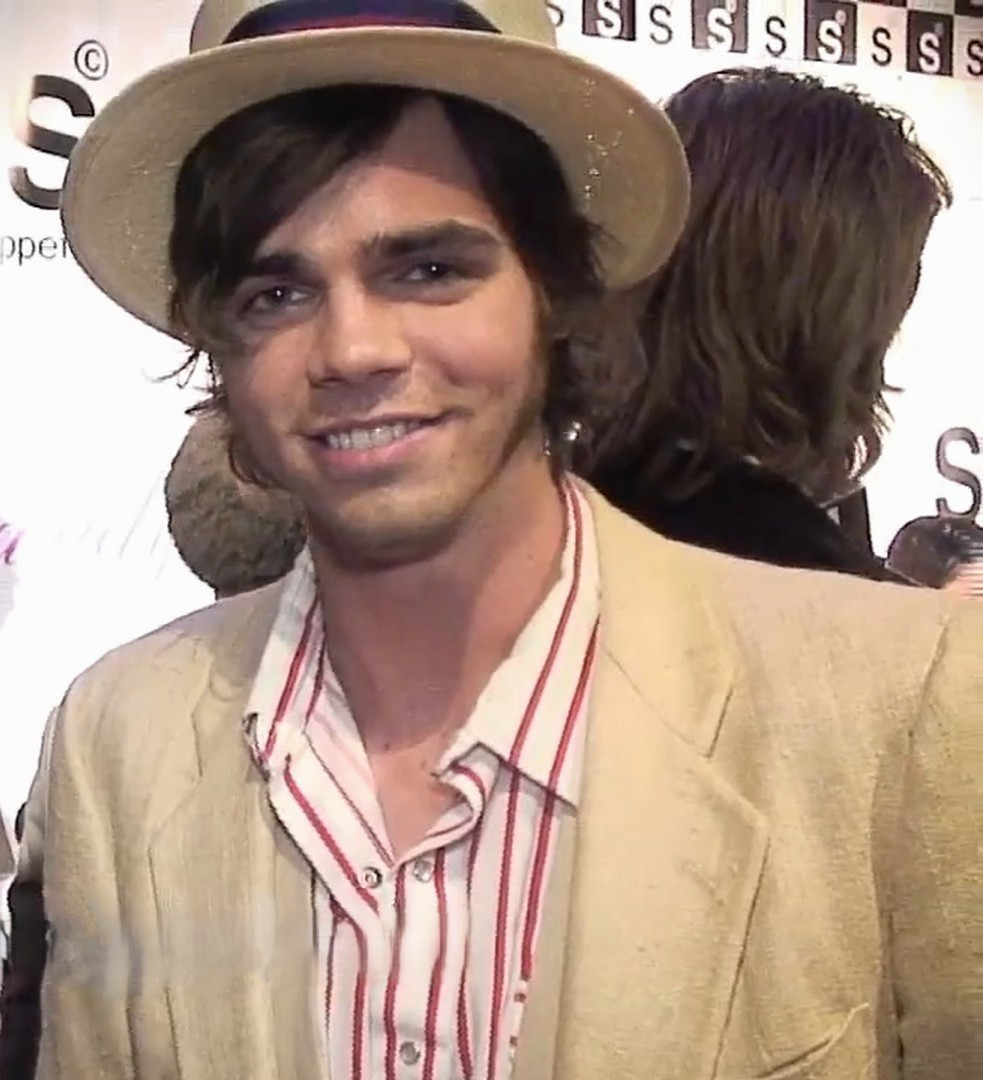
- Ewing in 2011
- Born: November 7, 1988 (age 37); Florida, U.S.
- Occupations: Actor, musician
- Years active: 2008–present
- Known for: Dylan Marshall on Modern Family

Reid Ewing (born November 7, 1988) is an American actor and musician widely known for his role as Dylan Marshall in the ABC sitcom Modern Family (2009–2020), and as Charlie Plunk in the TV series Zeke and Luther (2009–2011).

== Early life and education ==
Ewing is from Broward County, Florida. He appeared in theater productions in the South Florida area. He studied at the Dreyfoos School of the Arts in West Palm Beach and the School for Film and Television in New York City before moving to Los Angeles.

== Career ==
In April 2010, he was cast for the MTV film The Truth Below.

In addition to acting, Ewing plays the piano, guitar, and banjo. He wrote the song "In the Moonlight (Do Me)", which his character performed on Modern Family.

In 2010 he also released his first and only single, “Traffic Jam”.

In 2011, he appeared in Wendy's "Where's the beef?" commercials.

== Personal life ==
In 2015, Ewing revealed that he has suffered from body dysmorphic disorder, which resulted in several cosmetic surgeries. He came out as gay on November 23, 2015, while again addressing his body dysmorphia.

== Filmography ==
=== Films ===
Year	Title	Role
2008	Sunday! Sunday! Sunday!	Jesse
2010	In Between Days	Jim
2011	South Dakota	Carter
2011	The Truth Below	Ethan
2011	Fright Night	Ben
2013	10 Rules for Sleeping Around	Hugh Fields
2013	Crush	Jeffrey
2014	Mall	Beckett
2016	Temps	Curtis

=== Television ===
Year	Title	Role	Notes
2009–2020	Modern Family	Dylan Marshall	Recurring role (season 1–5; 7; 10); Guest role (season 6; 8–9); Main role (season 11); 52 episodes
2009–2011	Zeke and Luther	Charlie Plunk	Recurring role
2011	Good Luck Charlie	Derek	Recurring role, season 2
2011	Up All Night	Johnny Cope	Minor role, 1 episode

=== Web series ===
Year	Title	Role
2011	Reiding	Reid Rainbow
2013	The Power Inside	Devin
