= Jason Winer =

American actor

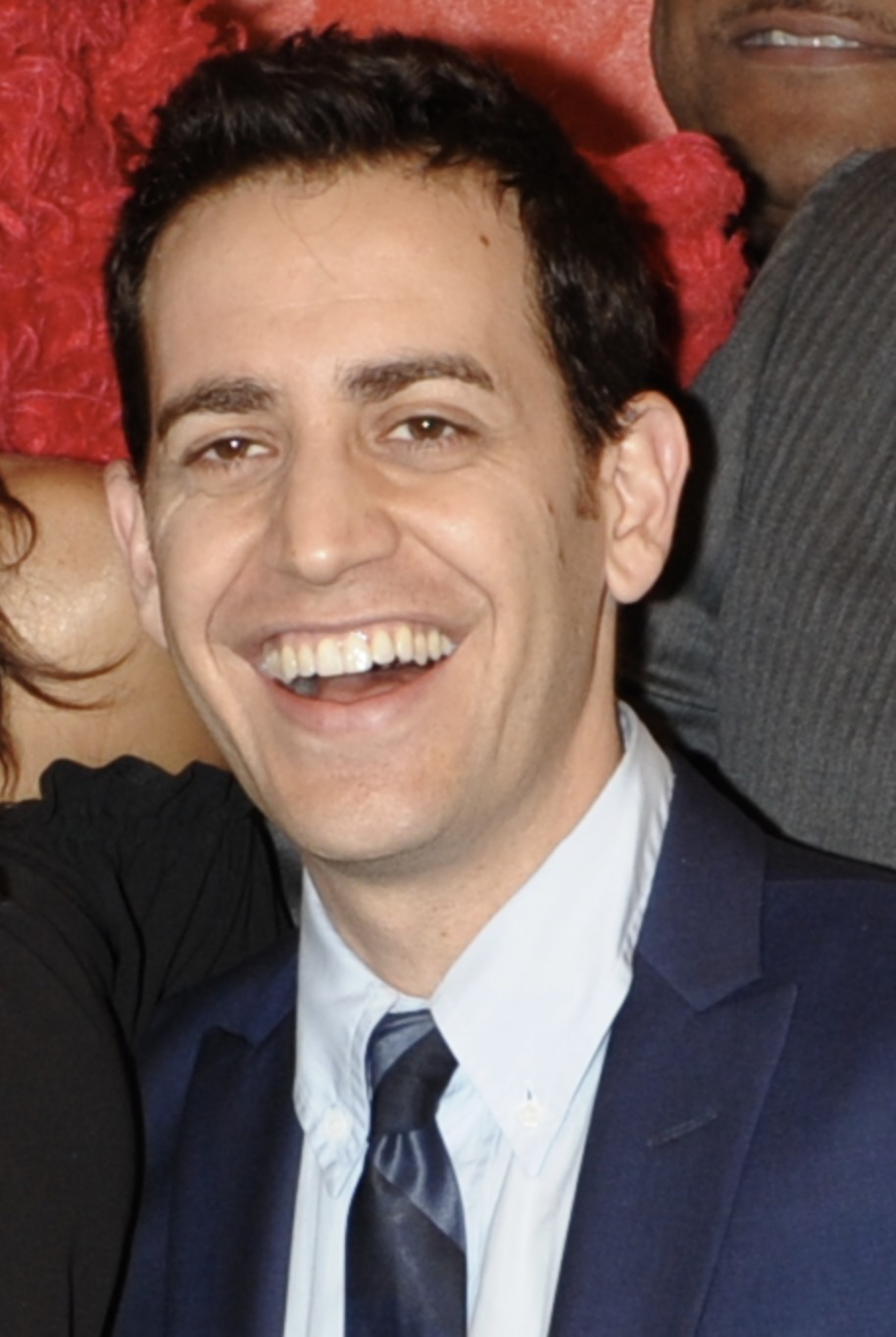
- Winer in 2010
- Occupations: Director; producer; actor
- Spouse: Jackie Seiden

Jason Winer is an American director, producer, writer, actor, and comedian. He is best known for directing the pilot and 22 additional episodes of the American sitcom Modern Family, and for the 2011 film Arthur.

== Early life ==
Winer was born and raised in Baltimore, Maryland. He is Jewish. He attended the Friends School of Baltimore and Northwestern University and is an alumnus of the Improv Olympic Theatre.

== Career ==
After college, Winer acted in television commercials for companies such as Budweiser, Nike and Dr Pepper. He also did stand-up comedy on channels such as HBO and was one of the stars on the TV game show The Blame Game on MTV. He eventually moved into work behind the camera, directing The Adventures of Big Handsome Guy and His Little Friend in 2005.

Since then, Winer has directed episodes of TV shows such as Kath & Kim, Samantha Who?, Carpoolers, New Girl and Don't Trust the B— in Apartment 23. He is a co-executive producer of Modern Family as well as a director. In 2010, Winer won the Directors Guild of America Award for Outstanding Achievement in Directing Comedy Series for Modern Family.

He was nominated for Emmy Awards for directing the Modern Family episodes "Pilot" and "Virgin Territory".

Winer directed the 2011 remake of Arthur, his first job as a motion picture director.

He also co-created the sitcom 1600 Penn with Josh Gad and Jon Lovett.

== Personal life ==
In 2012, he married Jackie Seiden in Palm Springs, California, in a service led by actor Adam Shapiro.
