= Family-friendly =

Product or event appropriate for all ages

A family-friendly product or service is one that is generally considered by a culture to be suitable for all members of an average family. Family-friendly restaurants are ones that provide service to families that have young children. Frequently, family-friendly products avoid marketing solely to children and attempt to make the product palatable to adults as well.

== Politics ==
In politics, new workplace legislation may be introduced to strengthen the family unit through giving parents more flexible family-friendly working hours or educational reforms to helping children with special needs and to give parents more control over how they are schooled.

== Hospitality industry ==
In the 2010s, hotels in the United States began to concentrate services into narrower concepts such as child-friendliness (where children stay and eat free) and pet-friendliness within the overall family-friendliness customer oriented concept.

== Media ==
The precise definition of "family-friendly" can vary depending upon the perceived acceptability of content for children — one of the most challenged books in United States libraries is Captain Underpants, a book that contains toilet humor that parents read out to children. Consumer advocacy groups representing parents have lobbied against media that contains profanity and criticized what they see as attempts to deny other families the ability to choose what is appropriate for their children. In December 2019 a broad coalition of US consumer groups, including the CDC and the CCFC, called for the Federal Trade Commission to carry out a sweeping review of digital media companies that target children. The values of the individual family, such as their belief in religion, can also affect whether the family perceives a product as family-friendly.

Both the MPAA film rating system and most television content rating systems have ratings for family-friendliness: a G rating in either is universally acceptable for all audiences, while a PG rating suggests that, while generally safe for children to watch, that there should be a parent or guardian present for guidance, since some mild adult-oriented material may be present. The MPAA's film rating system has not been without controversy (itself established after the Hays Code, which required all films to be at least somewhat family-friendly, was abolished), as theater chain interest groups have noted that films rated as high as R (adult-oriented films that persons under 17 cannot watch without an adult) could be interpreted as being family-friendly if the viewer is tolerant of profanity, while others may have far too much graphic violence or borderline-pornographic sexual images to be suitable for children.

The North American Entertainment Software Rating Board, which rates video games, classifies family-friendly content with an E rating.

== Events ==
A family-friendly (or all-ages) show, event or venue refers to one with no age restrictions for entry. In the United States, as applied to the world of concerts, this can refer to a show or venue where minors are permitted to attend a live performance, since those who are not of legal drinking age are generally not permitted in bars, but are permitted in restaurants which serve alcoholic beverages. In some cases the pop-up retail model is applied, as with the pop-up venues at the Treefort Music Fest.

More ideologically, following the trends of punk rock and embracing to an extent the opposition to drugs and alcohol inherent in the Straight-edge movement, All Ages shows have either no alcohol sales whatsoever, or sales are restricted through a system of wristbands or for patrons legally prohibited from consuming alcohol, generally as a large, black, "X" on the back of each hand. This symbol has been featured on many punk album covers, and the attendant term, "All Ages," was used as the title of a compilation album by North American punk icons Bad Religion. The term in this context does not denote a restriction on the thematic or lyrical content of the music.

== See also ==
- Bowdlerisation
- Childhood
- Children's interests (rhetoric)
- Children's television series
- Content rating
- Family film
- Four-quadrant movie
- Goldilocks principle
- Not safe for work
- Very special episode
