= Eric Stonestreet =

American actor (born 1971)

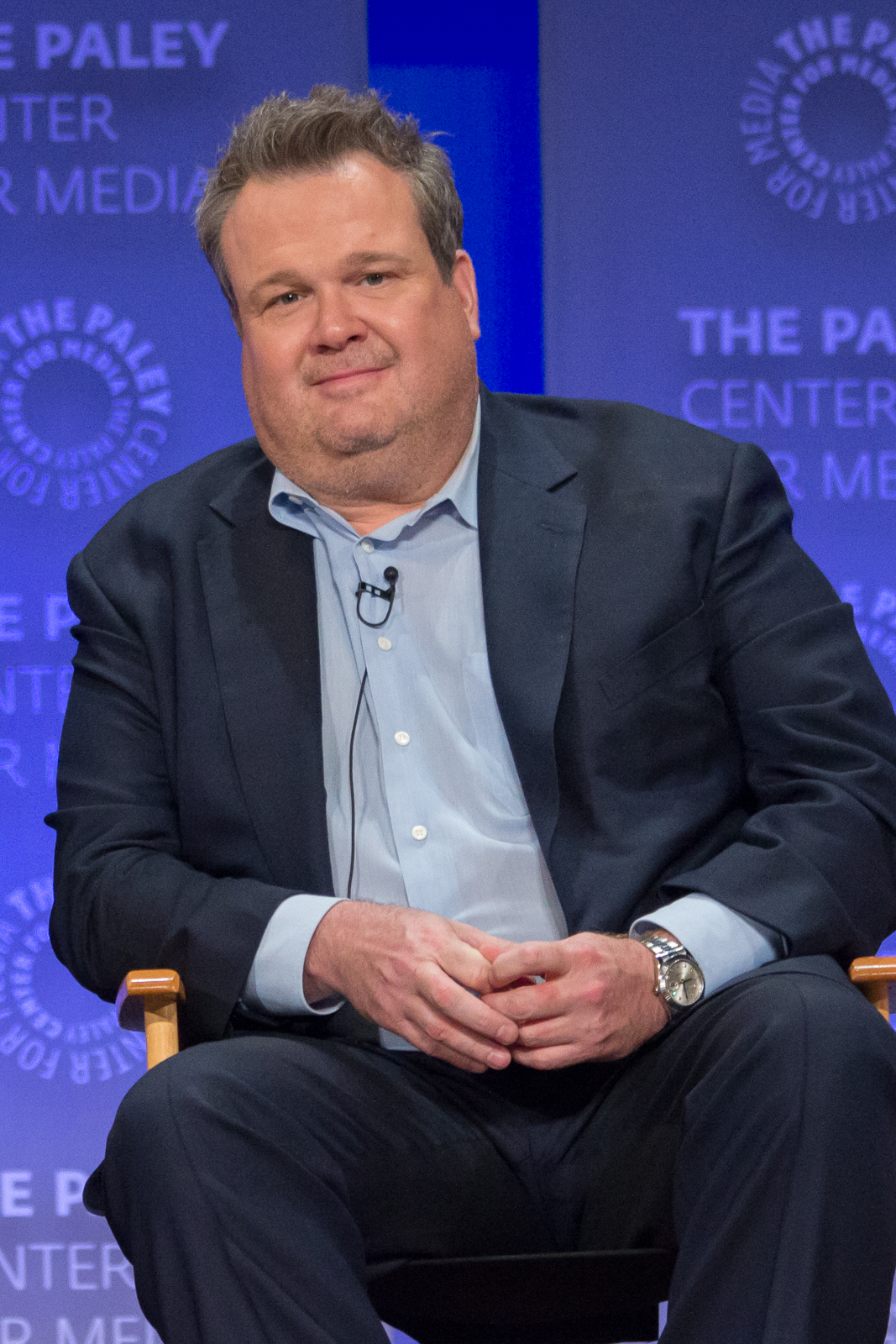
- Stonestreet in 2015
- Born: September 9, 1971 (age 55); Kansas City, Kansas, U.S.
- Education: Kansas State University (BA)
- Occupation: Actor
- Years active: 1999–present
- Spouse: Lindsay Schweitzer (m. 2025)
- Awards: 2 Emmys; 4 SAG Awards

Eric Allen Stonestreet (born September 9, 1971) is an American actor. He is known for portraying Cameron Tucker in the ABC sitcom Modern Family (2009–2020), for which he received two Emmy Awards for Outstanding Supporting Actor in a Comedy Series out of three nominations. He first rose to prominence in a recurring role on CSI: Crime Scene Investigation. He has also appeared in films including Bad Teacher (2011), Identity Thief (2013), The Loft (2014), and Confirmation (2016), and provides the voice of Duke in The Secret Life of Pets film franchise (2016–2019).

== Early life ==
Eric Allen Stonestreet was born in Kansas City, Kansas, on September 9, 1971, the son of teacher's aide Jamey Anne (née Ball) and retail business owner Vincent Stonestreet. He is of German descent. His family had a pig farm growing up. As a child, he wanted to become a clown, and created a clown character named Fizbo; by age 11, he was performing at younger children's birthday parties. He recalled in 2012, "I don't know where the name Fizbo came from. I do know one day that's what my dad was calling me and that's the name that I printed on my business cards." The name "Fizbo" was later used for a clown character he periodically played on Modern Family. Whenever Fizbo appeared in an episode, Stonestreet would do the clown makeup himself, stating that no one else could do it quite right.

Stonestreet attended Piper High School and Kansas State University, where he was in the Pi Kappa Alpha fraternity, graduating with a degree in sociology in 1996. While there, he made his stage debut when he appeared in Prelude to a Kiss, for which he auditioned on a dare and won the smallest role. He later appeared in All My Sons and Twelfth Night, before studying improv at ImprovOlympic and The Second City Training Center in Chicago, then moved to Los Angeles to begin his professional acting career.

== Career ==
=== Early work and smaller roles ===
He made his film debut in Almost Famous, as desk clerk Sheldon. He also played Dr. Benson in Girls Will Be Girls, Ed the Trucker in The Island, and Courtney's Neighbor in Ninja Cheerleaders. In 2007, Stonestreet appeared in the short film "Vinny's Vault," which was produced during the reality show On the Lot. He also appeared in the movies Identity Thief as Big Chuck, and Bad Teacher as Kirk.

He is also notable for his role as Ronnie Litre on CSI: Crime Scene Investigation. He also guest starred in television shows, such as Dharma & Greg, ER, Malcolm in the Middle, The Mentalist, NCIS, Nip/Tuck, Party of Five, Spin City, The West Wing, Pushing Daisies, Greg the Bunny, Providence, Close to Home, Crossing Jordan, Bones, Monk, and American Horror Story. Early in his career Stonestreet was featured in Kansas State University's 1996 football and the Big 12 Conference TV commercials' campaign as the "purple pride guy."

=== Modern Family and beyond ===
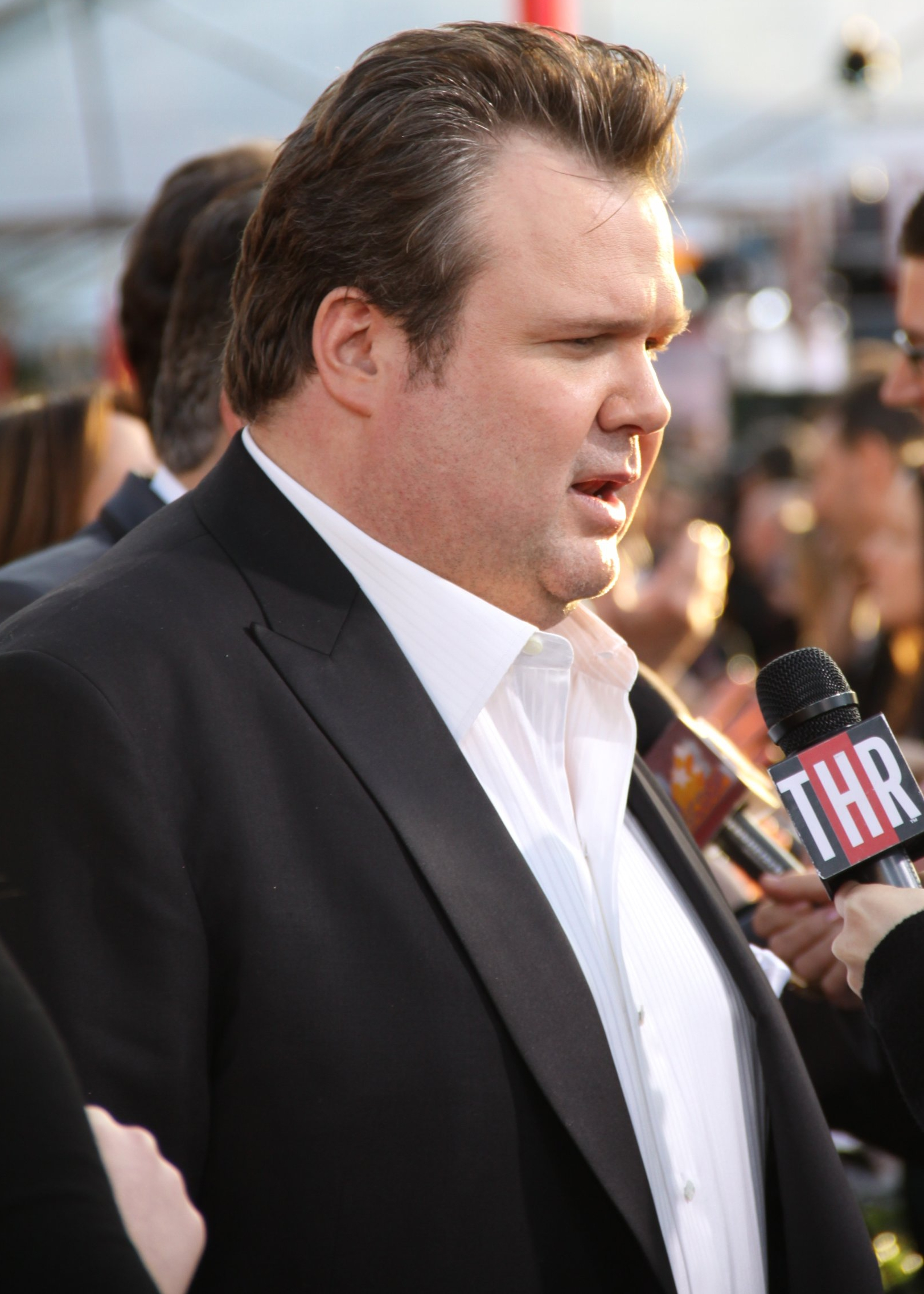
Stonestreet at the 2010 SAG Awards

Stonestreet played Cameron Tucker in ABC's Modern Family. His performance in the series was widely acclaimed and earned him numerous awards, including two Primetime Emmy Awards for Outstanding Supporting Actor in a Comedy Series, four SAG Awards for Outstanding Ensemble in a Comedy Series, and nominations for three Golden Globes for Best Supporting Actor in Television.

In 2013, he appeared in a series of advertisements for Australian retail store Big W. In the fall of the same year, Stonestreet played the "Fan Coach" in the AT&T "Be A Fan" commercial series that ran during the college football season, in addition to appearing in a MasterCard/Stand Up 2 Cancer commercial as himself. In 2014, he performed in "Weird Al" Yankovic's music video for "Tacky," a parody of Pharrell's "Happy". In the same year he also starred in the remake of the Belgian thriller Loft. He regularly appears onstage at IO West improv Theatre in Los Angeles.

In 2017, Stonestreet hosted the ABC competition series The Toy Box.

In 2020, Stonestreet appeared as a guest judge for a taping of auditions for the fifteenth season of America's Got Talent, in place of Heidi Klum. In the same year he appeared in the music video for Ariana Grande and Justin Bieber's song "Stuck with U".

In March 2021, it was announced that Stonestreet would be hosting Domino Masters for Fox. The competition series premiered on March 9, 2022.

In November 2024, Stonestreet was named as the godfather for the new Norwegian Cruise Line ship Norwegian Aqua.

== Personal life ==
Stonestreet began dating pediatric nurse Lindsay Schweitzer in June 2016, and they became engaged on August 22, 2021. On September 9, 2025, Stonestreet announced that they had married at their home in Kansas City. He is the stepfather to Lindsay’s twin sons.

Although he played a gay character in Modern Family, Stonestreet is heterosexual and has lightheartedly described himself as "openly straight". His Modern Family co-star and onscreen husband Jesse Tyler Ferguson (who is gay in real life) jokingly called him "gay-for-pay". Stonestreet supports LGBTQ causes; he refused Republican senator Rick Santorum's request to take a picture with him at the 2014 White House Correspondents' Dinner due to Santorum's staunchly anti-gay platform.

A keen sports fan, Stonestreet supports the Kansas City Chiefs football team and joined the new ownership group of the Kansas City Royals baseball team in 2019. He has also driven the pace car at several NASCAR events. He often attends football games at his alma mater, Kansas State University, and stays active with several organizations there.

Stonestreet is also a fan of drums, mainly a collector of them which he talked about on comedian Rob Riggle's podcast Riggle's Picks.

== Filmography ==
=== Film ===
Year	Title	Role	Notes
2000	Almost Famous	Sheldon the Desk Clerk	
2003	F.A.T.	Ranger	
2003	Girls Will Be Girls	Dr. Benson	
2003	Street of Pain	Floyd	Short film
2004	Straight-Jacket	Labor Organizer	
2004	Knuckle Sandwich	Bill	
2005	Saddam 17	The Clerk	Short film
2005	The Island	Ed the Trucker	
2007	The Drifter	Delivery Guy	Short film
2007	Stories USA	Floyd	Segment: "Street of Pain"
2008	Ninja Cheerleaders	Beergut	
2008	American Crude	Phil	
2010	Father vs. Son	Doug	
2011	Bad Teacher	Kirk Gay	
2013	Identity Thief	Big Chuck	
2014	The Loft	Marty Landry	
2016	The Secret Life of Pets	Duke (voice)	
2019	The Secret Life of Pets 2	Duke (voice)	

=== Television ===
Year	Title	Role	Notes
1999	Dharma & Greg	Chester	Episode: "See Dharma Run"
2000	I've Got a Secret	Himself	Unknown episodes
2000	Malcolm in the Middle	Phil	Episode: "Malcolm Babysits"
2000	Party of Five	Irv	2 episodes
2000	Spin City	The Dentist	Episode: "Smile"
2000	ER	Willie	Episode: "Mars Attacks"
2001	The West Wing	Staffer #1	Episode: "Bad Moon Rising"
2002	Greg the Bunny	Wilson	Episode: "Welcome to Sweetknuckle Junction"
2002	Providence	Ted Stout	Episode: "Eye of the Storm"
2001–2005	CSI: Crime Scene Investigation	Ronnie Litre	12 episodes
2005	Close to Home	Andrew Morgan	Episode: "Under Threat"
2006	13 Graves	Andrew Schoch	Television film
2007	Crossing Jordan	Steve Anderman	Episode: "D.O.A."
2007	Bones	D.C. Cop	2 episodes
2007	On the Lot	Actor	2 episodes
2007	American Dad!	Short Order Cook (voice)	Episode: "Dope & Faith"
2008	The Mentalist	Malcom Boatwright	Episode: "Red Hair and Silver Tape"
2008	Pushing Daisies	Leo Burns	Episode: "Comfort Food"
2008	NCIS	Harvey Ames	Episode: "Silent Night"
2009	This Might Hurt	Brad Maynard	Television film
2009	Monk	Boom Boom	Episode: "Mr. Monk and the UFO"
2009	Scare Tactics	Eric the Paranormal Guy	Episode: "28 Minutes Later"
2009	Nip/Tuck	Wesley Clovis	Episode: "Wesley Clovis"
2009–2020	Modern Family	Cameron Tucker	Main role; 11 seasons
2010	Good News Week	Himself	1 episode
2011	American Horror Story: Murder House	Derrick	Episode: "Piggy Piggy"
2013–2018	Sofia the First	Minimus (voice)	16 episodes
2014	Sesame Street	Himself	Episode: "Hansel & Gretel Playdate"
2015	Jeopardy!	Himself	2 episodes
2016	Blue Peter	Himself	Episode: "4915"
2016	Confirmation	Kenneth Duberstein	Television film
2017	The F Word	Himself	"Episode Seven"
2017	The Toy Box	Himself	16 episodes
2019	What Just Happened??! with Fred Savage	Himself	Episode: "Neighbor"
2020	America's Got Talent	Himself	Guest Judge (season 15)
2020	Who Wants to Be a Millionaire	Himself	Episode: "In The Hot Seat: Eric Stonestreet and Will Forte"
2021	Madagascar: A Little Wild	Harley Horns (voice)	Episode: "A Roar Is Born"
2022	Domino Masters	Himself	Main role
2023	American Auto	Ian	2 episodes
2023	The Santa Clauses	Magnus Antas / Mad Santa	Main role (season 2)
2025–2026	Dexter: Resurrection	Al Walker / Rapunzel	7 episodes
2026	Happy's Place	Dr. Russell Peabody III	Episode: "Couples Counseling"
2026	Sofia the First: Royal Magic	Minimus (voice)	Recurring role

=== Music videos ===
Year	Song	Artist	Notes
2014	"Tacky"	Weird Al Yankovic	
2020	"Stuck with U"	Ariana Grande and Justin Bieber	Cameo

== Awards and nominations ==
Organizations	Year	Category	Work	Result	Ref.
Children's and Family Emmy Awards	2025	Outstanding Supporting Performer	The Santa Clauses	Nominated	
Critics' Choice Television Awards	2011	Best Supporting Actor in a Comedy Series	Modern Family	Nominated	
Golden Globe Awards	2010	Best Supporting Actor – Television	Modern Family	Nominated	
Golden Globe Awards	2011	Best Supporting Actor – Television	Modern Family	Nominated	
Golden Globe Awards	2012	Best Supporting Actor – Television	Modern Family	Nominated	
Primetime Emmy Awards	2010	Outstanding Supporting Actor in a Comedy Series	Modern Family (episode: "Fizbo")	Won	
Primetime Emmy Awards	2011	Outstanding Supporting Actor in a Comedy Series	Modern Family (episode: "Mother's Day")	Nominated	
Primetime Emmy Awards	2012	Outstanding Supporting Actor in a Comedy Series	Modern Family (episode: "Treehouse")	Won	
Screen Actors Guild Awards	2009	Outstanding Ensemble in a Comedy Series	Modern Family (season 1)	Nominated	
Screen Actors Guild Awards	2010	Outstanding Ensemble in a Comedy Series	Modern Family (season 2)	Won	
Screen Actors Guild Awards	2011	Outstanding Ensemble in a Comedy Series	Modern Family (season 3)	Won	
Screen Actors Guild Awards	2011	Outstanding Male Actor in a Comedy Series	Modern Family (season 3)	Nominated	
Screen Actors Guild Awards	2012	Outstanding Male Actor in a Comedy Series	Modern Family (season 4)	Nominated	
Screen Actors Guild Awards	2012	Outstanding Ensemble in a Comedy Series	Modern Family (season 4)	Won	
Screen Actors Guild Awards	2013	Outstanding Ensemble in a Comedy Series	Modern Family (season 5)	Won	
Screen Actors Guild Awards	2014	Outstanding Male Actor in a Comedy Series	Modern Family (season 6)	Nominated	
Screen Actors Guild Awards	2014	Outstanding Ensemble in a Comedy Series	Modern Family (season 6)	Nominated	
Screen Actors Guild Awards	2015	Outstanding Ensemble in a Comedy Series	Modern Family (season 7)	Nominated	
Screen Actors Guild Awards	2016	Outstanding Ensemble in a Comedy Series	Modern Family (season 8)	Nominated	
