= BoJack Horseman season 5 =

BoJack Horseman
- Season 5
- Promotional poster for the season
- Starring: Will Arnett; Amy Sedaris; Alison Brie; Paul F. Tompkins; Aaron Paul
- No. of episodes: 12

Release
- Original network: Netflix
- Original release: September 14, 2018

Season chronology
- ← Previous; Season 4 Next → Season 6

The fifth season of the American animated television series BoJack Horseman was released on Netflix on September 14, 2018, and consisted of 12 episodes. It premiered with the episode "The Light Bulb Scene", and concluded with "The Stopped Show". BoJack Horseman takes place in a universe where humans and anthropomorphic animals co-exist. The series continues to focus on horse BoJack Horseman (Will Arnett), a washed-up 1990s sitcom star seeking a return to relevance. The season's overall narrative is mainly set around Philbert, the detective series that BoJack stars in. Other on-going plots include the struggling relationship between BoJack's roommate, Todd Chavez (Aaron Paul), and Yolanda Buenaventura (Natalie Morales), his girlfriend, and continued romantic struggles between BoJack's actor friend, Mr. Peanutbutter (Paul F. Tompkins) and Diane.

Season five contains many guest stars, including Wanda Sykes, Issa Rae, and Jessica Biel. The production crew was looking to diversify the series' cast, as to not only cast predominantly white people. The season's writers had the ultimate goal for BoJack to become sober and receive therapy, in order to move his character further. Prior to the season's release, Netflix sent a letter out to critics informing them of plot points not to mention in their reviews for fear of spoiling the audience; the letter was written from the perspective of Flip McVicker, a character from the season.

Season five was met with near universal acclaim upon release. One of the most acclaimed episodes of the season was "Free Churro", which received an Emmy Award nomination and an Annie Award nomination. Actress Issa Rae received a nomination at the 50th NAACP Image Awards for Outstanding Character Voice-Over Performance for her work on the show. The season received much analysis from critics and scholars, with heavy emphasis placed on its response to the #MeToo movement; other analyzed parts of the season include Philbert, Gina's musical number, and BoJack's strangulation of Gina.

== Episodes ==
BoJack Horseman season 5 episodes
No. overall	No. in season	Title	Directed by	Written by	Original release date	Prod. code
50	1	"The Light Bulb Scene"	Adam Parton	Kate Purdy	September 14, 2018	501
Well into the production of his new detective show and return to television, Philbert, anthropomorphic horse BoJack Horseman is having casual sex with his costar Gina Cazador and finds himself confused and aggravated by Flip McVicker, creator of Philbert. When BoJack takes offense to several scenes with unneeded sexuality, Flip writes a new scene where Philbert screws in a light bulb while naked. BoJack, not wanting to film any more nude scenes, tries to get his roommate Todd Chavez to infiltrate WhatTimeIsItRightNow.com, the website that streams Philbert, to send Flip an email prohibiting any further nude scenes; Todd obliges after his girlfriend, Yolanda Buenaventura, asks him to get a job, but he ends up becoming president of the website's ad sales and is unable to help BoJack. BoJack also admits to Princess Carolyn that he feels uncomfortable doing the show because Philbert reflects the worst parts of him, but both she and Flip promise that he and the character are separate people, so he films the scene. Mr. Peanutbutter picks his wife Diane Nguyen up from the airport, and hands over completed divorce papers.
51	2	"The Dog Days Are Over"	Amy Winfrey	Joanna Calo	September 14, 2018	502
After Diane's therapist suggests she break her routine, she decides to go to a party at Mr. Peanutbutter's house but learns he is dating waitress Pickles Aplenty. She abruptly leaves for Hanoi, Vietnam, her family's country of origin, but finds herself out of touch with the culture. She quickly adapts to it and meets an American film crew member who does not believe she speaks English, a ruse she perpetuates until she accidentally speaks when a light falls next to her. Diane returns home to be given her signed divorce papers; she tells Mr. Peanutbutter that she is happy for him in his new relationship but breaks down crying in private.
52	3	"Planned Obsolescence"	Aaron Long	Elijah Aron	September 14, 2018	503
BoJack discovers that Gina has a love for musicals and was always interested in singing, so he convinces Flip and Princess Carolyn to listen to her perform without telling her beforehand. She gives a mediocre performance and leaves embarrassed, and while she acknowledges that BoJack making her do it cleared up any ambiguity about her chances of succeeding, she asks him to not get involved in her personal life again. Mr. Peanutbutter convinces Pickles to watch the International Space Station being blown up with him despite her worries that they are moving too fast and accidentally admits that he still has feelings for Diane. Yolanda takes Todd to meet her hypersexual family, where her twin sister tries to seduce him by dressing as Yolanda, and her mother deduces that he is asexual and asks him to help her discover her own asexuality. After a mishap with a barrel of ancient lube leads to a fight, Yolanda comes out to her family as asexual and is accepted, but Todd breaks up with her after realizing she lied to her family about his credentials to make him look more impressive.
53	4	"BoJack the Feminist"	Anne Walker Farrell	Nick Adams	September 14, 2018	504
Diane is disturbed when Flip casts bigoted, misogynistic Vance Waggoner as Philbert's troubled partner. Mr. Peanutbutter is hurt that Princess Carolyn thinks he is not gritty enough for a reboot of Dog Day Afternoon, so he sets out to cause as much conflict as possible but only ends up helping everyone he meets. BoJack is hailed as a feminist icon after he expresses unrelated disgust at an award ceremony for Waggoner, which escalates when he says that choking women is wrong and becomes a sensation. Waggoner ducks any further controversy by proclaiming himself a feminist and drops out of Philbert, and Princess Carolyn brings in Mr. Peanutbutter to play his role. BoJack realizes that Philbert is perpetuating misogyny despite claiming to be a deconstruction of it and asks Diane to come on as a consultant, which she agrees to despite Flip's sexist attitude. Ana Spanakopita, Waggoner's publicist, meets with Diane to inform him that he has again been fired from his new film for bigotry but also plays for her the recording (Note: As depicted in the season 3 episode "Start Spreading the News" (2016)) of BoJack admitting that he attempted to have sex with Penny Carson, his friend Charlotte Carson's underage daughter, in New Mexico. (Note: As depicted in the season 2 episode "Escape from L.A." (2015))
54	5	"The Amelia Earhart Story"	Adam Parton	Joe Lawson	September 14, 2018	505
In 2007, Princess Carolyn, a young woman in Eden, North Carolina, falls for and is impregnated by the son of the wealthy family she cleans for. Her mother gives her her necklace and encourages her to marry into the family for the good of hers, but Princess Carolyn miscarries and instead leaves for Los Angeles to go to college. In the present, she returns to meet Sadie at a coffee shop, a teen mother set up to meet with Princess Carolyn who is looking to give her unborn child up for adoption. Through a series of phone calls, she learns that BoJack injured his back in a stunt accident on the Philbert set. After hanging out for a while, Princess Carolyn begins to alienate Sadie by snapping at people around them, despite the fact she tried to appear professional and sweet in front of her. Princess Carolyn tries her best to charm Sadie by sweet-talking her, but Sadie sees through the ruse and decides she is not a suitable candidate to adopt.
55	6	"Free Churro"	Amy Winfrey	Raphael Bob-Waksberg	September 14, 2018	506
In a flashback, BoJack's father, Butterscotch Horseman, picks BoJack up from soccer practice after a depressed Beatrice Horseman, BoJack's mother, fails to get him, and Butterscotch spends the entire car ride complaining about her. In the present, Beatrice has died and BoJack speaks at her funeral, his eulogy eventually becoming about himself as he tries to deconstruct his warped views on love, the relationship between him and his parents, and his mother's last words, which he realizes were actually her reading the sign on the wall of the intensive care unit. BoJack comes to a realization that while he will never have the good relationship with Beatrice that he always wanted and that he does not understand what she wanted herself, she deserves the open casket that she requested and opens it, only to realize he was in the wrong funeral parlor the entire time.
56	7	"INT. SUB"	Aaron Long	Alison Tafel	September 14, 2018	507
A married couple, Diane's therapist and a mediator for WhatTimeIsItRightNow.com, tell each other recent work stories where all the characters are changed to nonsensical versions of themselves. Diane's therapist tells her to give herself space from BoJack after she is unnerved by what she heard about him, and so BoJack tracks the therapist down and she convinces him to take her services, not specifying that he is actually agreeing to go to therapy. Diane is hurt when she finds out and stops seeing her therapist, only for BoJack to quit when he realizes that he was in therapy the whole time. Princess Carolyn requests a new office from Todd, but he is upset that she supposedly ate the last piece of string cheese in their apartment, leading to a fight that resolves when Todd finds his cheese and agrees to start paying rent. Diane confronts BoJack and becomes enraged when he says they are both equally unstable. She rewrites a scene so it reflects the circumstances of what Diane heard on the recording, something that only she and BoJack would understand.
57	8	"Mr. Peanutbutter's Boos"	Anne Walker Farrell	Kelly Galuska	September 14, 2018	508
The episode is told over four separate Halloween parties at BoJack's house, where at each party Mr. Peanutbutter takes a different partner. In 1993, he brings Katrina, his then-wife, who gets in a fight with him after he continually abandons her against his wishes. In 2004, he brings Jessica Biel, who fights with him after she sees BoJack dressed as a mummy, which invokes her fear of them. He takes Diane in 2009, where Diane, a big fan of BoJack, tries to talk to him just as he learns that Butterscotch died. Taking his reaction as a dismissal, she berates Mr. Peanutbutter for taking her to a party when he knows they make her uncomfortable, and he promises to never do it again. Todd, meanwhile, moves in with BoJack. In the present, Mr. Peanutbutter takes Pickles, but he upsets her when he cannot stop talking about his three ex-wives. Diane points out to Mr. Peanutbutter that his problem is his inability to mature as easily as his romantic partners often do, and she promises Pickles that she will be alright if she manages to get through the party.
58	9	"Ancient History"	Peter Merryman	Rachel Kaplan	September 14, 2018	509
Season one of Philbert wraps production, leaving Mr. Peanutbutter to ponder his next career move. Princess Carolyn is forced to meet with Ralph Stilton, her recent ex-boyfriend, when Mr. Peanutbutter pitches a show based on a copyrighted greeting card made by his company. She then learns there is a mother putting her almost born baby up for adoption. Ralph drives her to the hospital, but she is forced to tell him that she does not consider him a part of her life anymore, which inspires the mother to keep the baby. Emily, Todd's best friend from high school who he is now reconnecting with, creates a dating app for asexuals; while conversing with her, Todd notices she is distracted by her continuous stream of unfulfilling boyfriends, so he creates her a poorly designed sex robot named Henry Fondle, which she is put off by. Hollyhock, BoJack's estranged half-sister, comes to visit and disposes of BoJack's painkillers in a panic when she finds them, thinking he is attempting to drug her; this forces them to try and get more as BoJack claims he needs them, which leads to BoJack unintentionally committing to a relationship with Gina while trying to steal some from her house. BoJack and Hollyhock get caught in a sting operation during a drug buy and flee, during which Hollyhock jumps over a fence by boosting herself up on BoJack's back, making her realize he does not need his pills for pain. When she confronts him about this, an incensed BoJack tells her she can't understand the emotional pain he's been facing his whole life, and says the "one bad experience" she had with Beatrice (Note: As depicted in the season 4 episode "lovin that cali lifestyle!!" (2017)) is tame compared to what he endured. Before she departs, BoJack apologizes to Hollyhock and promises not to take painkillers unless he's injured again. After she leaves, BoJack gives into his withdrawal and impulsively drives into oncoming traffic.
59	10	"Head in the Clouds"	Amy Winfrey	Peter A. Knight	September 14, 2018	510
Two months later, BoJack has almost recovered from his broken arm, has increased his painkiller consumption, and has still not publicized his relationship with Gina. The day of the Philbert premiere, Princess Carolyn learns that Flip lifted a line in the show from a joke on a popsicle stick, and the two estranged joke writers come demanding compensation. Princess Carolyn instead fixes the relationship between the two and they sign a release form. While trying to get rid of Henry Fondle, Todd ends up taking him to work, and the robot becomes the CEO of the company by accident. At the premiere, Diane is put off by BoJack saying that the show made him feel better about the wrongs he has done and privately confronts him, getting him to admit to previously attempting to have sex with an underage Penny after a long argument. Diane leaves in disgust and accidentally untethers a giant Philbert balloon, while a shaken BoJack impulsively kisses a now successful Gina in front of a crowd. Henry Fondle orders a second season of Philbert. Mr. Peanutbutter drives Diane home, upset by Pickles not staying to watch the premiere, and Diane invites him inside after a tender conversation where she decides to quit the show.
60	11	"The Showstopper"	Aaron Long	Elijah Aron	September 14, 2018	511
In the second season of Philbert, a series of strangulations start to occur. BoJack begins to hallucinate the runaway Philbert balloon and brief flashes of his everyday life being on a dark TV set, as well as a golden set of stairs leading up to a bright destination. When he receives a letter under his door that promises to expose his deeds (actually a Philbert advertisement), he begins to conflate his real life with Philbert's and investigates everyone close to him, including Diane, Princess Carolyn, and Charlotte Carson. He has a bizarre musical dream performed by Gina that questions the true motivation of his addiction to fame. Gina finds his stashes of painkillers and leaves him when he tries to take them back by force, while on the show, her character discovers Philbert is actually the one responsible for the stranglings. He starts to choke her, and BoJack does not stop when Flip ends the take, forcing Mr. Peanutbutter to pull him off as everyone watches in horror. BoJack flashes out of reality to the stairs and ascends them, finding himself in a crudely drawn empty space with the Philbert balloon floating above him.
61	12	"The Stopped Show"	Anne Walker Farrell	Joanna Calo	September 14, 2018	512
Mr. Peanutbutter and Diane argue over whose fault it is that they had sex after the Philbert premiere two months prior but end up having sex again. After another argument, Diane seems to convince Mr. Peanutbutter to be honest with Pickles and rejects his offer to start another relationship, but he is unable to tell Pickles the truth and instead proposes to her. BoJack awakens unable to remember the previous night until Princess Carolyn shows him a video taken of it, having been leaked to the media. She sets up an interview with Biscuits Braxby, who softballs BoJack and Gina during their interview. Gina tells BoJack that she will not take action against him for the sake of her burgeoning career, but she never wants to interact with him again outside of their professional lives. Henry Fondle is ousted from WhatTimeIsItRightNow.com for his sexual misconduct, and Todd takes him out to a field to kill him with a taser. Philbert is cancelled as a result, giving Princess Carolyn the opening she needs to go to Eden, North Carolina just as Sadie gives birth to a female porcupine; Sadie gives the baby to Princess Carolyn for being the only prospective parent that was kind to her. BoJack asks Diane to write an article about all his misdeeds, but she instead takes him to a rehab clinic. He asks her why she is helping him after all he has put her through, and she tells him a story about a friend who abandoned her in high school, but who she still took care of when she went through a crisis. As BoJack walks inside, Diane waves to him before driving away.

== Cast and characters ==
=== Main ===
- Will Arnett as BoJack Horseman
- Amy Sedaris as Princess Carolyn
- Alison Brie as Diane Nguyen
- Paul F. Tompkins as Mr. Peanutbutter
- Aaron Paul as Todd Chavez

=== Recurring ===
- Rami Malek as Flip McVicker
- Stephanie Beatriz as Gina Cazador
- Hong Chau as Pickles Aplenty

=== Guest ===
- Ed Helms as Kyle
- Natalie Morales as Yolanda Buenaventura
- Issa Rae as Dr. Indira, Diane's therapist
- Laura Linney as herself
- Wanda Sykes as Mary Beth, Dr. Indira's wife
- Eva Longoria as Yolanda's mother
- John Leguizamo as Yolanda's father
- Bobby Cannavale as Vance Waggoner
- Angela Bassett as Ana Spanakopita
- Jaime Pressly as Sadie
- David Sedaris as Cutie Cutie Cupcake, Princess Carolyn's mother
- Jessica Biel as herself
- Aparna Nancherla as Hollyhock Manheim-Mannheim-Guerrero-Robinson-Zilberschlag-Hsung-Fonzerelli-McQuack
- Ken Jeong as Dr. Allen Hu
- Raúl Esparza as Ralph Stilton
- Brian Tyree Henry as Cooper Thomas Rogers Wallace, Jr.
- Daveed Diggs as Cooper Thomas Rogers Wallace, Sr.
- Margo Martindale as Esteemed Character Actress Margo Martindale
- Whoopi Goldberg as Mikhaela
- James Adomian as Stuart, Princess Carolyn's assistant
- Abbi Jacobson as Emily
- Daniele Gaither as Biscuits Braxby

== Production ==
=== Development ===
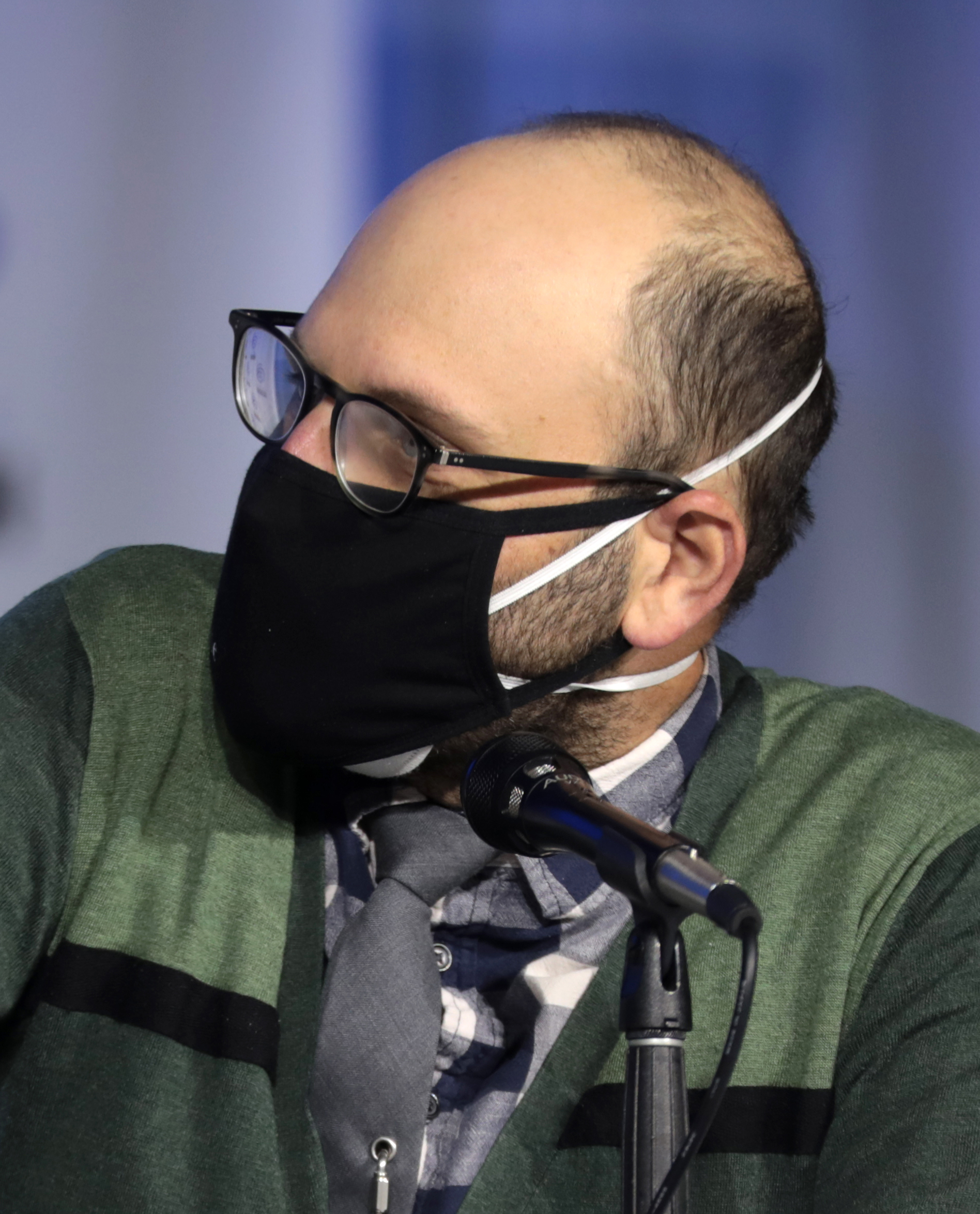
Series creator Raphael Bob-Waksberg served as an executive producer for the season.

Thirteen days after the fourth season's release, Netflix renewed BoJack Horseman for a fifth season in September 2017. Series creator Raphael Bob-Waksberg, Steven A. Cohen, and Noel Bright continued to serve as executive producers. Cast members Will Arnett and Aaron Paul also returned as executive producers alongside production company The Tornante Company. Early planning for season five started in 2017. In an interview regarding the season, Bob-Waksberg noted that they attempt to take more creative risks with each subsequent season, and he enjoyed creating episodes during the season that were unique both narratively and presentation-wise.

Bob-Waksberg also mentioned that they "burn bridges" every season, and that for season five, they decided to "[burn the bridge] of" Beatrice, the estranged mother of BoJack. The storyline revolving around BoJack's television series, Philbert, satirized the genre of "male anti-hero" television series like True Detective. The plot was introduced to aid commentary on how BoJack views himself and how the audience views him; the mocking of television writers through Flip McVicker was added to balance out the show's constant bashing of television executives and actors. It was also used as a way to offer commentary on the tropes of the character of BoJack and on the series itself. The final table reads for the season took place around early 2018. All episode scripts and voice acting was completed by July, and animation was underway. Diane's design was slightly tweaked by giving her a new haircut, which Bob-Waksberg later joked was a significant part of season five's production. Shortly following the season's release, Netflix renewed the series for a sixth and final season.

=== Influences ===
According to Bob-Waksberg, partial inspiration for the season came from his agency, Creative Artists Agency, who had signed Mel Gibson on as a client around the season's production. Bob-Waksberg took offense to this, due to Gibson's prior controversies and used it as inspiration for the season's theme of forgiveness and how long it takes before a person deserves such forgiveness. According to Bob-Waksberg, the season's parallels to the Harvey Weinstein scandals were not planned originally but were somewhat incorporated into the season once they became public; the scandals did not affect much about the overarching narrative of the season. The majority of season five was written before the scandals against Weinstein came out, and Bob-Waksberg claimed it worked in the season's favor, allowing it to mimic real world issues, without being explicitly about a certain issue. However, a co-worker of Arnett had met Weinstein at a party beforehand, and he commended the show's staff for their work on the episode "Fish Out of Water"; this made Bob-Waksberg worry that people like Weinstein were going to get the wrong impression from the series, and so he used that concern to influence part of the season and to end BoJack's continuous chances at redemption.

=== Writing ===
To create the season's storylines, the writers decided to formulate plots more organically, rather than taking from real-life. While creating the season, they ultimately decided that the season should contain BoJack getting sober and beginning therapy. The writers felt that they had to further change his character and so incorporated BoJack's attempts at sobering up. Many viewers took offense to BoJack's characterization in season three, finding him "irredeemable", but felt he was much more pleasant in season four; the writers wanted to emphasize to the audience during season five that it was still the same character, and so they made him much more complex and even worse at times. Bob-Waksberg made note of the #MeToo movement, which "fed into the plot" of the season. The movement forced him to reconsider the show's own culpability, and so they made the season hoping to show the audience that "this kind of behavior isn't cool, don't emulate this." The writer's room made sure to not portray BoJack in a strictly positive light in the season, as they didn't want to "glamorize him" and mislead the audience into believing he was someone they should aspire to be like. Gina was written to be "as fleshed out [as she could be] in one season", as to have her actions and characteristics towards BoJack be understandable for the audience.

=== Casting ===
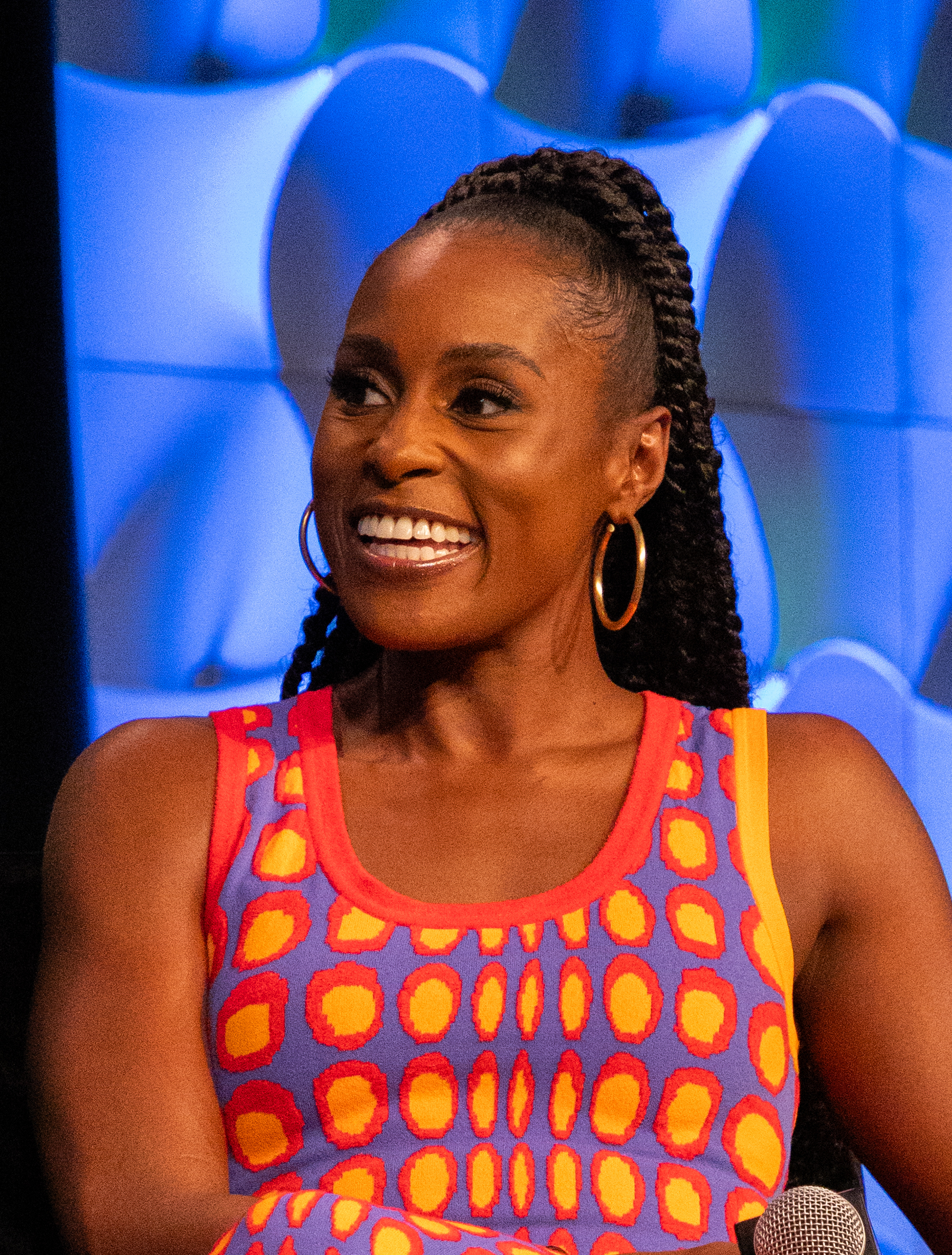
Issa Rae (pictured in 2025) guest starred in the season.

Will Arnett and Aaron Paul continued to appear as the series' titular protagonist BoJack Horseman and Todd, respectively. Amy Sedaris, Alison Brie, and Paul F. Tompkins also returned for the season. Season five also includes multiple guest stars, such as Wanda Sykes, Issa Rae, and Jessica Biel. Rami Malek stars as the reoccurring Flip McVicker, a character that was introduced in the previous season. After last being seen in the third season finale, Margo Martindale returned as Character Actress Margo Martindale—a fictionalized version of herself—during the fifth season, in a smaller cameo role. According to Bob-Waksberg, the casting crew wanted to hire more people of color to guest star on the show, as they didn't want to "[give] all the juicy parts to the white people". The crew started to keep track on the amount of minority groups they had given roles to, in order to "[get] better every year as a function of both actors hired and lines of dialogue".

== Marketing and release ==
To promote the series' renewal, Netflix posted a video announcement on social media, showcasing a text exchange between BoJack and an executive from Netflix, who informs him of the renewal. Prior to its release, it was reported the season would premiere on the subscription-based streaming video on demand platform Netflix, like all previous seasons of the show, and a set release date was announced in June 2018. The official trailer for the season was released by Netflix on September 4, 2018, ten days before its premiere. The season was released on September 14, 2018, consisting of twelve episodes.

=== Letter to critics ===
Prior to the season's release, screeners were given to critics. In most cases, Netflix gives a bullet-pointed list of spoilers to not mention in their reviews, but they decided to instead send them a letter posing as Flip McVicker. The letter had a "demanding, condescending, and contemptuous" tone, whilst also satirizing the idea of a "spoiler letter". It included the statement: "All you have to do is stand there and reflect... TV is a mirror. But that's not all TV is. TV is also a bitch. TV is a lover. TV is a child. TV is a mother."

== Themes and analysis ==
=== The #MeToo movement ===
...while the show doesn't deal head on with the effects of assault on male victims, it does raise the issue of the pervasive sexism and harassment that exists in Hollywood.

— Margaret Tally, The Limits of #MeToo in Hollywood.

The character of BoJack has been called an embodiment of the #MeToo movement, particularly with his traits of toxic masculinity and misogynistic attitudes. Jen Chaney of Vulture noted that the season devoted much of its runtime to the #MeToo movement, calling Gina an example of this; she claims that Gina's decision to keep BoJack's assault against her quiet shows that she does not want to challenge a system that is constantly rigged. Chaney insinuates that the series of Philbert, particularly its misogynistic protagonist, is meant to parallel BoJack Horseman, both containing similar themes and starring a male character who is "fixated on his psychological issues". Writing for her book The Limit of #MeToo in Hollywood, author Margaret Tally suggests that the season was written to emphasize the dysfunctional nature of BoJack, using this as a way to also show that his behavior is not unusual amongst other men in Hollywood. Tally also says that the season uses BoJack's characterization to show that he has changed, pointing out how, despite his hesitation, he agrees to do a nude scene for Philbert without arguing with Flip over it, but stands up for other women on the set when put in similar situations.

Essayist Arya Rani points out that the season openly mocks Hollywood figures who do the bare minimum yet are hailed as trailblazers. She discusses this in the context of Vance Waggoner, a character from "BoJack the Feminist", who parodies individuals in the entertainment industry granted second chances they don’t deserve. Waggoner is awarded a "Lifetime Achievement Award in Forgiveness" after publicly admitting to attempted sexual assault of a police officer, racist remarks toward Jews, and the rape of women on movie sets. Vance originally starts out on the series as a caricature of Mel Gibson, but grows into a more general parody of the misbehavior many men in Hollywood commit.

=== Philbert ===
The Philbert storyline is a satirization of shows that perpetuate toxic masculinity and other misogynistic traits, and acts as a parody of auteur filmmakers like Flip McVicker. Diane's unwillingness to accept the sexist Philbert script in "BoJack the Feminist" is described as an example of her role on set as the "feminist kill-joy"; she fights for feminist values but is often viewed by other characters as caring too much. BoJack is unable to distinguish what is happening in reality and what is happening in Philbert, an example of how he is unable to see that the series is a satirization of people who live like him, instead taking it as coincidentally mirroring his own reality. Professor Slava Greenberg takes Philbert as an "ironic" parallel to BoJack Horseman, both being released on streaming services and both containing misogynistic male protagonists. Flip's treatment of women has been likened to the treatment of The Comeback's character of Gigi; Flip ignores and demeans the women writers on Philbert, even telling one to simply "collect [her] paycheck" and not bother him, treatment that Gigi often endures for simply suggesting story ideas. In his review of the season, Greg Cwik of Slant suggests that Philbert serves to reinforce the theme that life imitates art—particularly BoJack’s life—a motif explored frequently throughout the season.

=== Gina's musical number and strangulation ===
A hallucinating BoJack (left) watches Gina (middle) perform the song, with multiple actors around her dressed as people from BoJack's past.

In "The Showstopper", BoJack, while high on painkillers, hallucinates his girlfriend Gina singing an elaborate musical number entitled "Don't Stop Dancing 'Til [sic] the Curtains Fall". The song takes inspiration from other musicals—notably Cabaret—and deconstructs the assertion that "the show must go on". The sequence includes multiple actors dressed as different people in BoJack's life, particularly the people he's previously hurt. The song perpetuates the belief that movie stars like BoJack should continue to entertain and merchandise themselves until their death, even if it causes them pain and suffering. BoJack uses the song to reassure himself that he can push through his pain by continuing to perform, reiterating similar advice he previously told to his past co-star Sarah Lynn. He wishes to leave show business, but his worries of emasculation and fears of losing out on profit force him to continue. The scene shows that BoJack has lost control of his subjectivity, and is more concerned with not being good enough than his mental well-being.

Near the end of the same episode, BoJack strangles Gina while filming Philbert after taking an excess amount of painkillers in a single day. The act ironically calls back to a previous episode in the season—"BoJack the Feminist"—where BoJack preaches not to choke women, the only feminist value he exhibits in the episode. In the book Psychology and Pop Culture: An Empirical Adventure, the strangulation is likened to the Harvey Weinstein scandals as an example of BoJack's blatant disrespect towards women. Critic Hannah Giorgis notes that Gina remains professional during subsequent interview appearances alongside BoJack, refusing to accept BoJack's apology and wanting to keep him out of her life; despite being an irregular way to approach the situation, Gina is still happy with it, and it doesn't make her suffering any less validated. She has finally made it in Hollywood, and doesn't want such an event to define her in the eyes of the public.

== Reception ==
=== Critical response ===
Professional ratings
Aggregate scores
Source	Rating
Metacritic	92/100
Rotten Tomatoes	98%
Review scores
Source	Rating
Vox	4.5/5 stars
The A.V. Club	B+
IGN	9.6/10
Entertainment Weekly	A−
IndieWire	A

On the review aggregator Rotten Tomatoes, the season has an approval rating of 98% based on 48 reviews, with an average score of 9.3. The site's consensus reads "BoJack Horseman continues confidently down the thematic rabbit hole with a fresh and poignant season that's as devastating as it is hilarious." On Metacritic, which uses a weighted average, the season holds a score of 92 out of 100 based on 6 reviews, indicating "universal acclaim".

Ben Travers of IndieWire, who writes that the series seemed incapable of stopping its growth in quality, notes the season's effort to look inward and address controversy, even its own. Entertainment Weekly's Darren Franich gave the season a positive review, praising Rami Malek's addition to the cast and the season's commentary on Hollywood. Franich also called the season "a precision-missile focus on contemporary TV", giving it an A−. Les Chappell, writing for The A.V. Club, viewed the season as "painfully funny and also one of the most incisive looks at the [human condition] there is". The review notes "The Light Bulb Scene" as a highlight of the season. In a review from IGN, Alicia Lutes praised the season, saying that it continues the streak of storytelling and emotional risks the series often takes.

The experimentation and building of its characters earned the season a highly positive review from Liz Shannon Miller, another IndieWire writer. Miller also commended the season for bringing a focus back onto the humor, even if she felt that certain jokes could be "overplayed" at times. It received praise from Samantha Nelson of The Verge, noting its ability to have a surplus of ideas in each episode, as well as its witty dialogue, as highlights. However, he found Todd's sub-plots to be noticeably lower quality than others; despite finding his plot in episode 3 to be both humorous and sentimental, Nelson describes Todd as being a "relic" of the season's early seasons. For Vox, Emily VanDerWerff commended the show's response to the #MeToo movement, suggesting that the series uses BoJack as a stand-in character to comment on it and other relevant issues.

Caroline Framke of Variety branded "Free Churro" as one of her favorite television episodes of 2018, praising Will Arnett's performance as BoJack and ultimately noting the episode as a triumph of the season. Moreover, Lester Fabian Brathwaite, writing for Observer, called "Free Churro" a "tour-de-force performance", saying the episode is evidence that the series is one of Netflix's best, adding that it "soars because of its eloquence". Alan Sepinwall of Rolling Stone praised the episode for its theatrical structure, drawing comparisons between its final gag and the ending of "Fish Out of Water".

=== Accolades and nominations ===
At the 46th Annie Awards the season won two awards, Best General Audience Animated TV/Broadcast Production and Outstanding Achievement for Voice Acting in an Animated Television/Broadcast Production for "The Dog Days are Over" and "Free Churro", respectively. The season was also nominated at the 71st Primetime Creative Arts Emmy Awards for Outstanding Animated Program, also for "Free Churro", but ultimately lost to an episode of The Simpsons. The season won the Critics' Choice Television Award for Best Animated Series in 2019. Issa Rae received a nomination at the 50th NAACP Image Awards for Outstanding Character Voice-Over Performance, but she lost to Samuel L. Jackson for Incredibles 2.
