= Interspecies =

Interspecies may refer to:

- Interspecific, something occurring between species
  - Interspecific competition
  - Interspecies communication
  - Interspecies friendship
  - Interspecies family
  - Interspecies quorum sensing
  - Interspecies sex
    - Interspecies erotica
    - Interspecies breeding
  - Interspecific pregnancy
- An organization founded by Jim Nollman
