= BoJack Horseman (soundtrack) =

2017 soundtrack album by various artists

BoJack Horseman (Music From The Netflix Original Series)

Soundtrack album by Various Artists
- Released: September 1, 2017
- Recorded: 2013–2017
- Length: 42:01
- Label: Lakeshore Records
- Producer: Jesse Novak; Andrew Gowan

BoJack Horseman (Music From The Netflix Original Series) is the soundtrack album for the adult animated black comedy-drama series BoJack Horseman. The soundtrack was released by Lakeshore Records in digital and physical formats on September 1 and 29, 2017. It includes several songs, among them the full version of the main theme, Patrick Carney and Michelle Branch's version of America's "A Horse with No Name", Sextina Aquafina's "Get Dat Fetus, Kill Dat Fetus", the themes from Horsin' Around and Mr. Peanutbutter's House, and the entire score for the episode "Fish Out of Water". A vinyl edition was released on January 12, 2018, and a second re-issue was released in September 2020.

== Development ==
The main title theme was composed by Patrick Carney, drummer for the blues-rock duo the Black Keys, with his uncle Ralph Carney. The initial sound is Patrick's Roland Jupiter-4 analog synthesizer running an arpeggiator patch, triggered externally with a click track control voltage from Pro Tools. Patrick added acoustic drums, and emailed the music to his uncle Ralph who added various saxophone parts and bass trombone. Patrick composed the song merely as a test of his new home studio arrangement, not knowing where it would go. A few months later, Noel Bright emailed Patrick asking for a piece of music as a theme for BoJack Horseman, and Patrick sent him the collaboration tune, which was immediately accepted. The television show opening theme was edited down to about 55 seconds long but the Carneys' original collaboration is several minutes longer, containing parts not heard on the show.

The ending credits theme "Back in the 90s (BoJack's Theme)" was performed by the indie-pop act Grouplove. Jesse Novak composed the incidental music for the series. Raphael Bob-Waksberg, the series' showrunner, hired Novak for the scores, as Novak had previously worked on some of the sketch comedies Bob-Waksberg hosted. Bob-Waksberg requested Novak score a demo for the series, and Novak agreed. He was a fan of Lisa Hanawalt's work, the illustrator of the show, and had added "A lot of the music I feel I continued in the show I started in that first week demoing for them because I felt that inspiration for a lot of the sound came from the visuals and feelings that I was already familiar with through Lisa and Rafael's work."

For the Horsin' Around theme song, which Novak had sung, he stated that was interested in doing music which was a "genre parody" and attributed that composing for spoof and parody genres is an "opportunity to experiment with those sounds which manage to tickle your own funny bone and hopefully reach the viewers that way too". The theme was primarily influenced from the musical sound of Full House (1987–1995) as he used saxophone and harmonica for the theme, which imitated the muzak sounds. For the third episode, "Prickly-Muffin", he composed a score suite, which was a mix of "Britney Spears and The Neptunes"; as he was influenced by their works, he tried to attempt the same so as it recreates the music from the late-1990s and early-2000s. However, he tweaked the pop culture references, to be more comedic and felt that editing the vocals was the most important part of the show.

The theme for Mr. Peanutbutter's House was composed by the help of Los Angeles Philharmonic. Novak admitted that Mr. Peanutbutter was his favorite character and wanted his theme to be "influenced by hip-hop but in a slightly uninformed way". Originally planned as a 10-second song, as he did not have an idea to compose a full theme, it was later extended to a 45-second theme after the creators requested for a full-length theme for a character in the third season. He hired vocalists from the philharmonic orchestra to perform the theme song. Novak wrote the entire score for the "Fish Out Of Water" episode, and later re-wrote it twice as the first attempt was not well received. He incorporated electronic sounds to add more color for the score.

== Reception ==
The Afterglow magazine's C.S Harper wrote that the soundtrack "creates a grim storyline, one that is often the reality for those in the entertainment world. By mirroring BoJack's story through song, the soundtrack adds a tone of self-awareness to the show. Each season uses diverse tracks from different genres to comment on a variety of themes, including substance abuse and the meaninglessness of celebrity life. Though these topics are dark, they explore the less glamorous facets of the Hollywood experience that many people overlook." Relight's A. J. Martin wrote "the soundtrack is really only something that's appealing for fans of the show, but there's pieces of it anyone could enjoy". Variety named the title theme as one of the "best theme songs of the streaming era". Writing for Looper magazine, Mike Floorwalker praised about the theme song saying, "Its dream-like vibe, punctuated with pounding, distorted drums and a knife-edged horn section, is nothing short of perfect; it somehow manages to broadcast the show's entire aesthetic despite its complete absence of lyrics."

=== Chart performance ===
Chart (2017)	Peak position
UK Soundtrack Albums (OCC)	24
US Billboard 200	81
US Soundtrack Albums (Billboard)	10

== Track listing ==
No.	Title	Writer(s)	Artist	Length
1.	"BoJack's Theme"	Patrick Carney, Ralph Carney	Patrick Carney feat. Ralph Carney	0:56
2.	"Horsin' Around Theme"	Jesse Novak & Raphael Bob-Waksberg	Jesse Novak	0:44
3.	"A Horse with No Name"	Dewey Bunnell	Patrick Carney feat. Michelle Branch	4:35
4.	"Mr. Peanutbutter's House Theme"	Jesse Novak	Jesse Novak	0:40
5.	"I Will Always Think of You"	Jesse Novak, David Corwin & Rachel Kaplan	Jane Krakowski & Colman Domingo	1:22
6.	"Get Dat Fetus Kill Dat Fetus"	Jesse Novak & Joanna Calo	Jesse Novak feat. Daniele Gaither & Manus Dunbar	1:30
7.	"Kyle and the Kids"	Jesse Novak	Jesse Novak feat. Carrick Moore Gerety	0:36
8.	"Stars" (Live at Montreux)	Janis Ian	Nina Simone	6:37
9.	"Back in the 90's"	Christian Zucconi	Grouplove	0:43
10.	"BoJack's Theme" (Full Length)	Patrick Carney, Ralph Carney	Patrick Carney feat. Ralph Carney	4:23
11.	"Seaport"	Jesse Novak	Jesse Novak	1:00
12.	"Hallway"	Jesse Novak	Jesse Novak	1:35
13.	"Kelsey Apology"	Jesse Novak	Jesse Novak	0:57
14.	"Chasing Kelsey"	Jesse Novak	Jesse Novak	1:42
15.	"Seahorse Birth"	Jesse Novak	Jesse Novak	0:47
16.	"Post Birth"	Jesse Novak	Jesse Novak	0:26
17.	"Baby Seahorse and Convenience Store"	Jesse Novak	Jesse Novak	2:29
18.	"Shark Chase"	Jesse Novak	Jesse Novak	0:34
19.	"Darkness and Tunnel"	Jesse Novak	Jesse Novak	0:54
20.	"Fan Section"	Jesse Novak	Jesse Novak	0:39
21.	"Factory"	Jesse Novak	Jesse Novak	1:58
22.	"Flying"	Jesse Novak	Jesse Novak	0:54
23.	"Seahorse Reunion"	Jesse Novak	Jesse Novak	0:49
24.	"Final Kelsey Pursuit"	Jesse Novak	Jesse Novak	0:28
25.	"Sea of Dreams"	Brad Oberhofer	Oberhofer	4:43

== Songs featured in the series ==
In addition to Novak's score, the show has occasionally featured other songs in the closing credits. In season one, Lyla Foy's song "Impossible" appears in the end credits of the seventh episode, "Say Anything"; the Death Grips song "No Love" is used in "Downer Ending", the eleventh episode; and the Rolling Stones song "Wild Horses" and Tegan and Sara's "Closer" in "Later", the first-season finale. The Kevin Morby song "Parade" closed out "Yes And", episode ten of the second season, and the Courtney Barnett song "Avant Gardener" plays during "Out to Sea", the second-season finale. The show features Oberhofer's song "Sea of Dreams" in the fourth episode of the third season, "Fish out of Water", and Nina Simone's cover of Janis Ian's "Stars" in "That Went Well", the last episode of that season. In season four, Magic Sword's "Infinite" is used in "Thoughts and Prayers", the fifth episode of the season, K.Flay's "Blood in the Cut" in "Stupid Piece of Sh*t", the sixth episode, and Jenny Owen Youngs's "Wake Up" in "What Time Is It Right Now", the twelfth episode.

Princess Carolyn's hold music is the song "Jellicle Songs for Jellicle Cats" from the musical Cats. The St. Vincent song "Los Ageless" plays throughout "The Light Bulb Scene", the first episode of the fifth season, including the credits. Vetiver's "Last Hurrah" plays near the end credits in season five, episode 9, "Ancient History." The song "Under the Pressure" by the War on Drugs plays through the end of the episode and credits of season five, episode 12, "The Stopped Show". The 2007 song "Mr. Blue" by Catherine Feeny, used in the final moments of the series finale, received appreciation from fans.
