= Free Churro =

- BoJack Horseman episode
- BoJack Horseman eulogizes his mother.
- Episode no.: Season 5 Episode 6
- Directed by: Amy Winfrey
- Written by: Raphael Bob-Waksberg
- Original release date: September 14, 2018
- Running time: 26 minutes

Episode chronology
← Previous "The Amelia Earhart Story"	Next → "INT. SUB"
- BoJack Horseman season 5

"Free Churro" is the sixth episode of the fifth season of the American animated television series BoJack Horseman, and the 54th episode overall. It was written by series creator Raphael Bob-Waksberg and directed by Amy Winfrey, and was made available for streaming, along with the rest of season five, via Netflix on September 14, 2018.

In the episode, BoJack Horseman (Will Arnett) delivers his mother's eulogy. He struggles with how to talk about her, considering the abuse that he suffered in his childhood, and digresses into dark humor, television anecdotes, and a story of a cashier who gave him a free churro. All the while, BoJack struggles to understand the meaning of his mother's last words. Arnett, who also voices BoJack's father Butterscotch in a brief cold open, is the only voice actor to appear in this episode.

"Free Churro" was released to critical acclaim for its execution of an ambitious concept, as well as Arnett's voice performance. The episode made several year-end lists of the best television episodes of 2018 and received a Primetime Emmy Award nomination for Outstanding Animated Program. Arnett's performance additionally received an Annie Award for voice acting.

== Plot ==
In a cold open flashback, Butterscotch Horseman (voiced by Will Arnett) drives his young son BoJack (also Arnett) home from soccer practice, where he complains that his wife Beatrice has locked herself in the bedroom after seeing the Henrik Ibsen play A Doll's House. The moral of Butterscotch's rant, he says, is that one needs to realize that nobody else will look out for them.

In the present, BoJack gives a eulogy for his mother at a funeral home. He begins with a story of how he stopped at Jack in the Box on his way to the funeral, and the cashier gave him a free churro when BoJack explained where he was going. Throughout the eulogy, BoJack banters with the organist, imitates the gruesome face his mother made when she died, and tells stories about his life, his mother, and TV shows like Becker and his breakthrough show, Horsin' Around. At one point, he tells what appears to be a nice story about Beatrice, only to reveal that it was not true and that he had taken the story from an episode of Maude. Many of his anecdotes detail the abuse he endured from both of his parents, as well as his father's death in a duel. Additionally, BoJack tries to parse out the meaning of his mother's final words, "I see you."

At the end of the episode, BoJack realizes that Beatrice was reading the letters "ICU" on the intensive care unit where she was admitted. Upon discovering that his mother's last words were meaningless, he becomes angry, saying that the cashier who gave him a free churro showed him more kindness than Beatrice ever did. After calming down, BoJack realizes that while he will never have the good relationship with Beatrice that he always wanted and that he does not understand what she wanted herself, she deserves the open casket that she requested. He finally opens the casket, realizing that he is at the wrong funeral and that he has been eulogizing to a room of geckos.

== Production ==
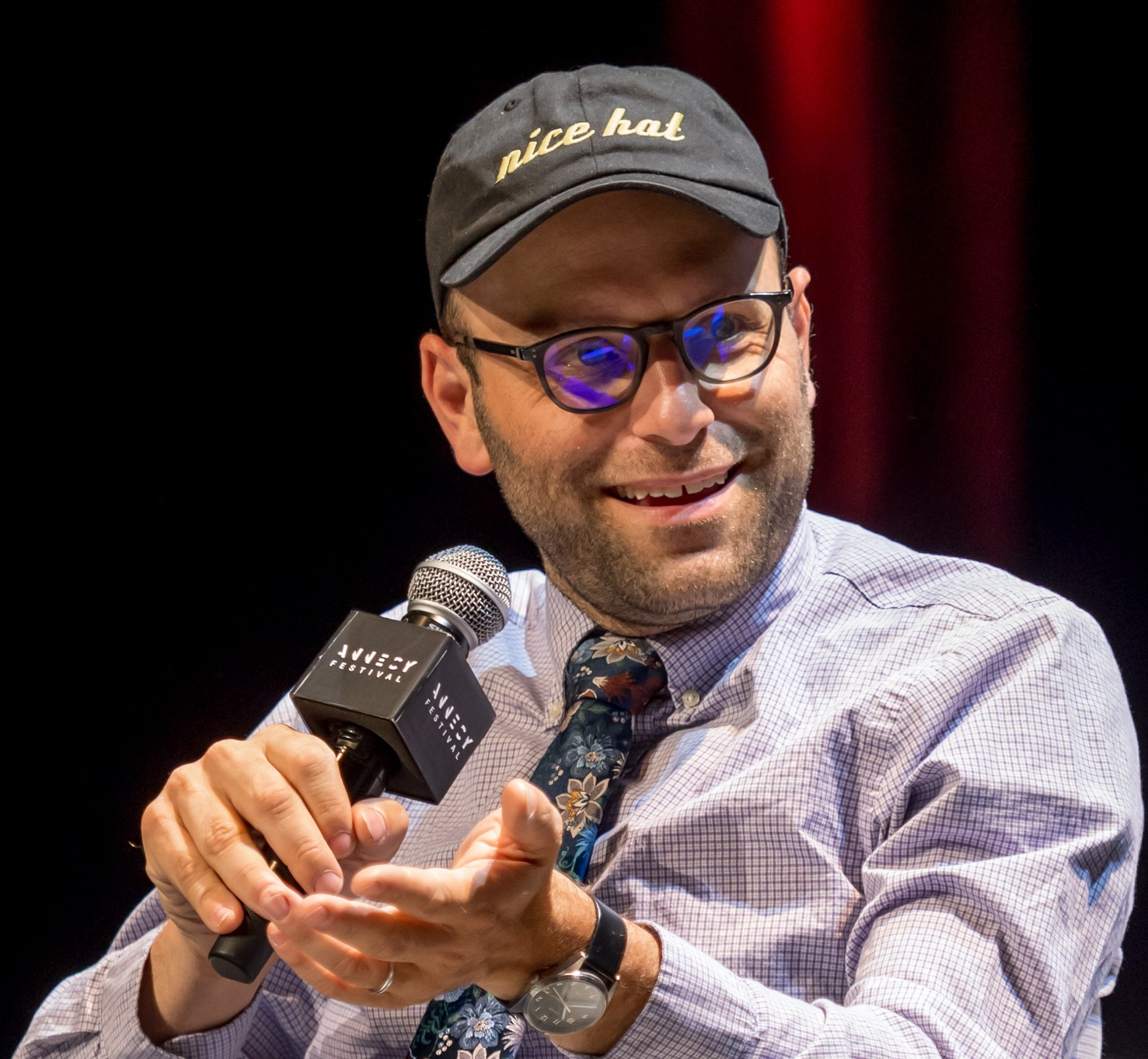
Raphael Bob-Waksberg in 2025

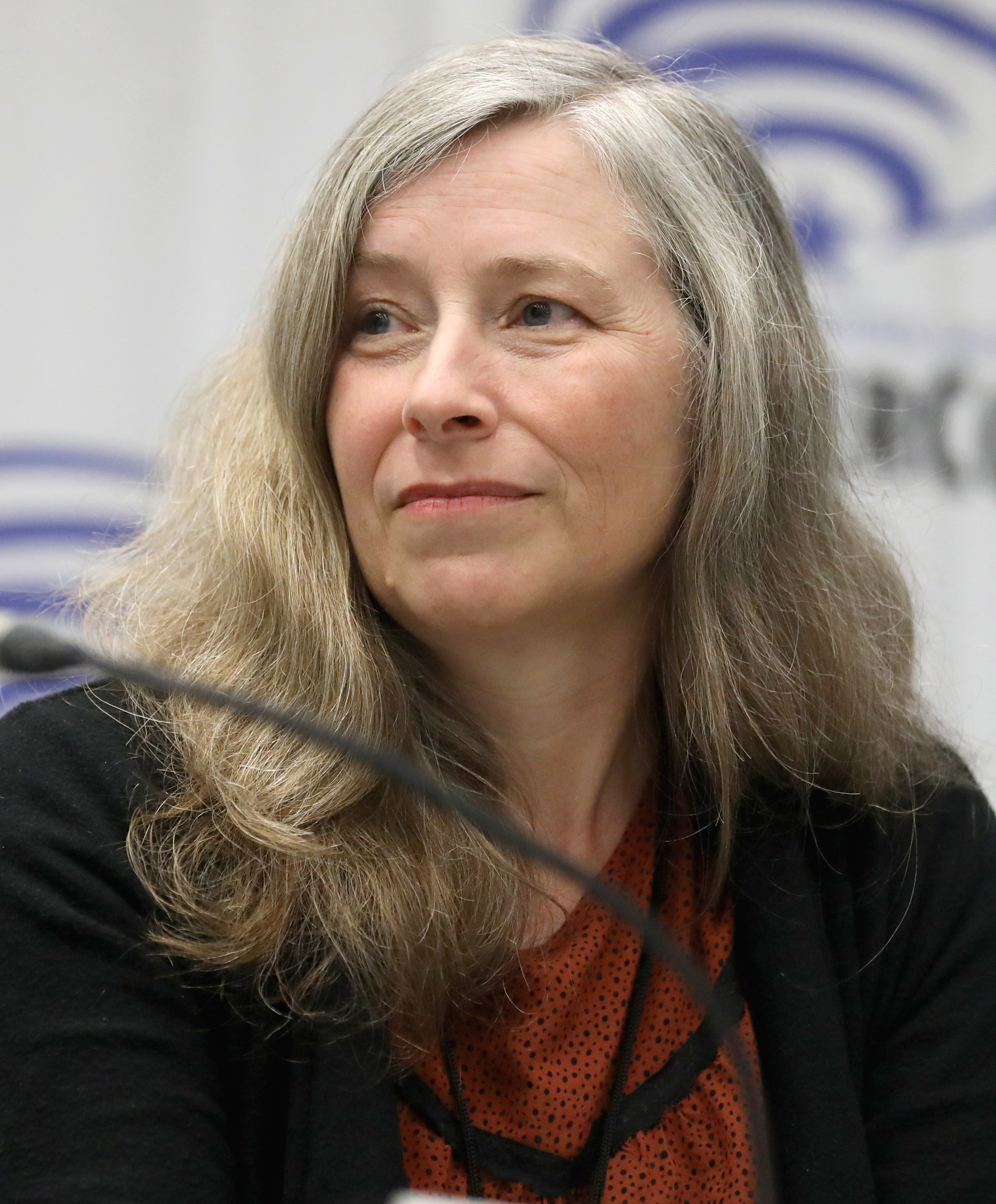
Amy Winfrey in 2024

The episode was written by Bob-Waksberg and directed by Winfrey.

"Free Churro" was written by BoJack Horseman series creator Raphael Bob-Waksberg and directed by Amy Winfrey. It is the sixth episode of the fifth season of BoJack Horseman, and the 55th overall episode of the series. All of season five, including "Free Churro," was made available for streaming on Netflix on September 14, 2018.

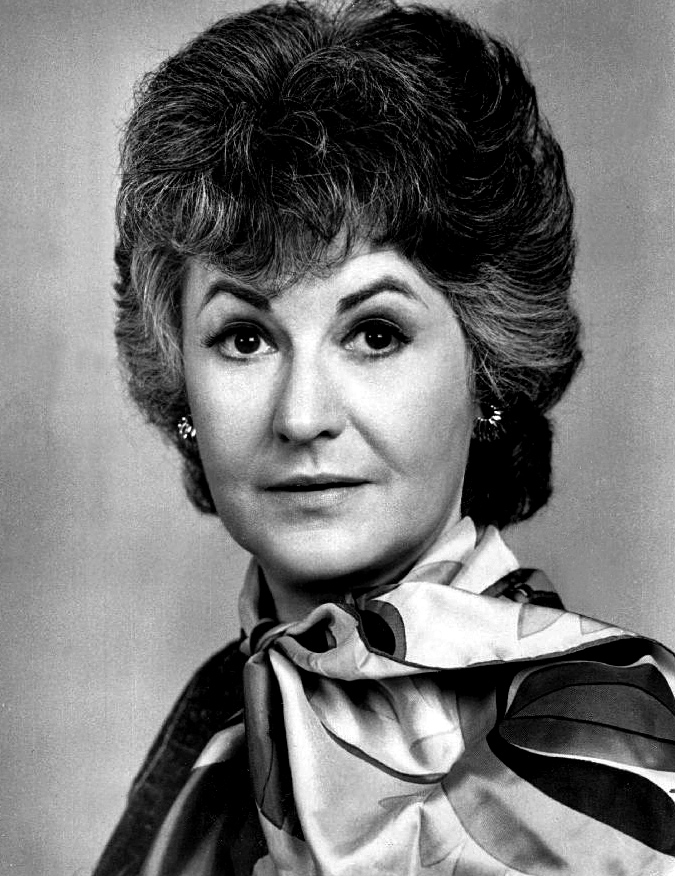
Bea Arthur's performance as Maude Findlay partially inspired BoJack's monologue.

The primary challenge of the episode was in maintaining audience interest across a twenty-minute monologue. For inspiration, Bob-Waksberg watched the Maude episode "Maude Bares Her Soul," which consists almost entirely of the Maude, played by Bea Arthur, speaking to her therapist. Bob-Waksberg said that watching the episode showed him how to construct "an A story and a B story and a C story" within a single monologue. BoJack's attempts to understand his mother's final words became the "A story," the point to which the monologue kept returning.

As the eulogy takes place in one room, with BoJack standing behind a podium, Winfrey selected three discrete camera angles, one for each style BoJack employs in his monologue: "talking about his mother, riffing on things, and telling funny stories." Wanting to let Bob-Waksberg's script and Arnett's voice performance anchor the episode, Winfrey made only "sophisticated, simple choices" that would complement the writing and voice acting. Due to the limited setting, motion, and camera angles, Winfrey and the other animators focused most of their attention on what Bob-Waksberg calls "face acting," or the animation of facial expressions. The creative team worried that it would be "boring to watch a guy talking for a half hour," and considered replacing some of the animation with flashback sequences set to Arnett's narration, similar to the re-enactments in the Comedy Central series Drunk History, but the idea was dismissed in favor of rendering the episode "purely." Although the funeral attendees are not seen until the final shot, the sound mix was tweaked to indicate that there were other people in the room after executive producer Noel Bright said that the original mix felt more like a one-man show than a eulogy.

Bob-Waksberg considers "Free Churro" the inverse of the season three episode "Fish Out of Water," which is almost entirely silent. Will Arnett is the only voice actor to appear in the episode, as the voice of both BoJack and his father Butterscotch. Arnett said that he had "never read anything like" the "Free Churro" script, and did not know what the table read would entail. Unlike other episodes of BoJack Horseman, where every line of dialogue is recorded multiple times, Arnett recorded "Free Churro" in large segments, with little direction from the creative team.

== Reception ==
=== Critical reception ===
"Free Churro" was released to critical acclaim, with multiple reviewers proclaiming the episode as the highlight of the season. Alan Sepinwall of Rolling Stone and Rachel Syme of The New Republic, for instance, referred to the episode as season five's "greatest triumph" and "apex," respectively, while Don Trumbore of Collider told readers that, "if you never watch another episode of BoJack Horseman, make it this one." The Guardian's Rebecca Nicolson praised the execution of the episode's concept, saying that it is "a rare series that can dedicate 30 minutes to a monologue and not test viewers' patience." Writing for the Observer, Lester Fabian Braithwhite said that the tragicomic balance struck by BoJack's eulogy "encapsulates what makes Raphael Bob-Waksberg's animated Netflix series one of the best shows on television."

Some reviewers directly mentioned the episode's approach to its dark subject matter, with Rebecca Patton of Bustle saying that "Free Churro" "nails" the experience of mourning an "awful person" like Beatrice Horseman, while Vulture's Daniel Kurland voiced his approval for the way that the episode "eloquently comments on how nobody really has the answers when it comes to death." Arnett's voice performance was also the subject of praise, with Daniel Fienberg of The Hollywood Reporter saying that his work is "as good as voiceover work gets," and Greg Cwik of Slant Magazine proclaiming "Free Churro" to be the "apogee of Arnett's career." Emily St. James of Vox took things a step further, saying it would be "a bigger travesty than usual" if Arnett did not win an Emmy Award for his performance. The A.V. Club's Les Chappell gave the episode an "A" grade, stating that one "can hear every last bit of forced levity, resentment, and genuine pain as BoJack tries to find some way to come to terms with Bea's death, and his feelings or lack thereof about the matter."

=== Accolades ===
"Free Churro" appeared on several publications' lists of the best television episodes of 2018, with John Maher of Paste calling the episode "absolutely magnificent," Time's Judy Berman referring to it as "wistful, bitter, funny and profoundly meta," and Caroline Framke of Variety describing the plot as "a winding, surprising road that never once loses sight of where it's headed." Writing for Mashable, Jess Joho said that the episode was "one of the most darkly real portraits of one's agony as they say goodbye to an abusive parent." Margaret Lyons of The New York Times dubbed "Free Churro" "the best episode of anything I saw in 2018," and "a distillation of everything 'BoJack Horseman' does right." Once again, Bob-Waksberg and Arnett were praised, with Berman thanking them for "an episode that made me forget I was watching a cartoon horse," and The Atlantic's Lenika Cruz saying that, "in an ideal world, 'Free Churro' would guarantee an Emmy to Will Arnett for voice-acting and to the series for writing."

"Free Churro" was nominated for Outstanding Animated Program at the 71st Emmy Awards. It was the first nomination in this category for BoJack Horseman, although Kristen Schaal had previously been nominated for Outstanding Character Voice-Over Performance as Sarah Lynn in "That's Too Much, Man!" At the awards ceremony, "Free Churro" lost to the Simpsons episode "Mad About the Toy." At the 46th Annie Awards, Arnett won the award for Outstanding Achievement for Voice Acting in an Animated Television / Broadcast Production for his performance in "Free Churro." He beat Debi Derryberry (F is for Family), Juliet Donenfeld (Pete the Cat), Patrick Warburton (Skylanders Academy), and Tara Strong (Unikitty!) for the award.
