= Say Anything (BoJack Horseman) =

- BoJack Horseman episode
- Critics praised the ending, in which Princess Carolyn (Amy Sedaris) stares out her office window at the city below as her phone alarm wishes her a happy fortieth birthday. Critics noted "Say Anything" has a noticeably darker ending than usual.
- Episode no.: Season 1 Episode 7
- Directed by: Martin Cendreda
- Written by: Joe Lawson
- Production code: 107
- Original release date: August 22, 2014
- Running time: 25 minutes

Guest appearances
- Kevin Bigley as Quentin Tarantulino; Rachel Bloom as Laura; Raphael Bob-Waksberg as Charley Witherspoon; Kristin Chenoweth as Vanessa Gekko; Stephen Colbert as Mr. Witherspoon; Adam Conover as Paparazzi Blue-Jay; Dave Segal as Paparazzi Robin; J. K. Simmons as Lenny Turteltaub; Stanley Tucci as Herb Kazzaz

Episode chronology
← Previous "Our A-Story Is a 'D' Story"	Next → "The Telescope"
- BoJack Horseman (season 1)

"Say Anything" is the seventh episode of the first season of the American animated television series BoJack Horseman. It was written by Joe Lawson and directed by Martin Cendreda. The episode was released, along with the rest of season one, on Netflix on August 22, 2014. The episode follows BoJack Horseman's agent Princess Carolyn as she struggles with competition from her rival Vanessa Gekko as well as having difficulties in managing BoJack.

"Say Anything" received positive reviews from critics with praise for its jokes and storytelling. The episode was called a turning point in the series and for the title character, with a noticeably darker ending.

== Synopsis ==
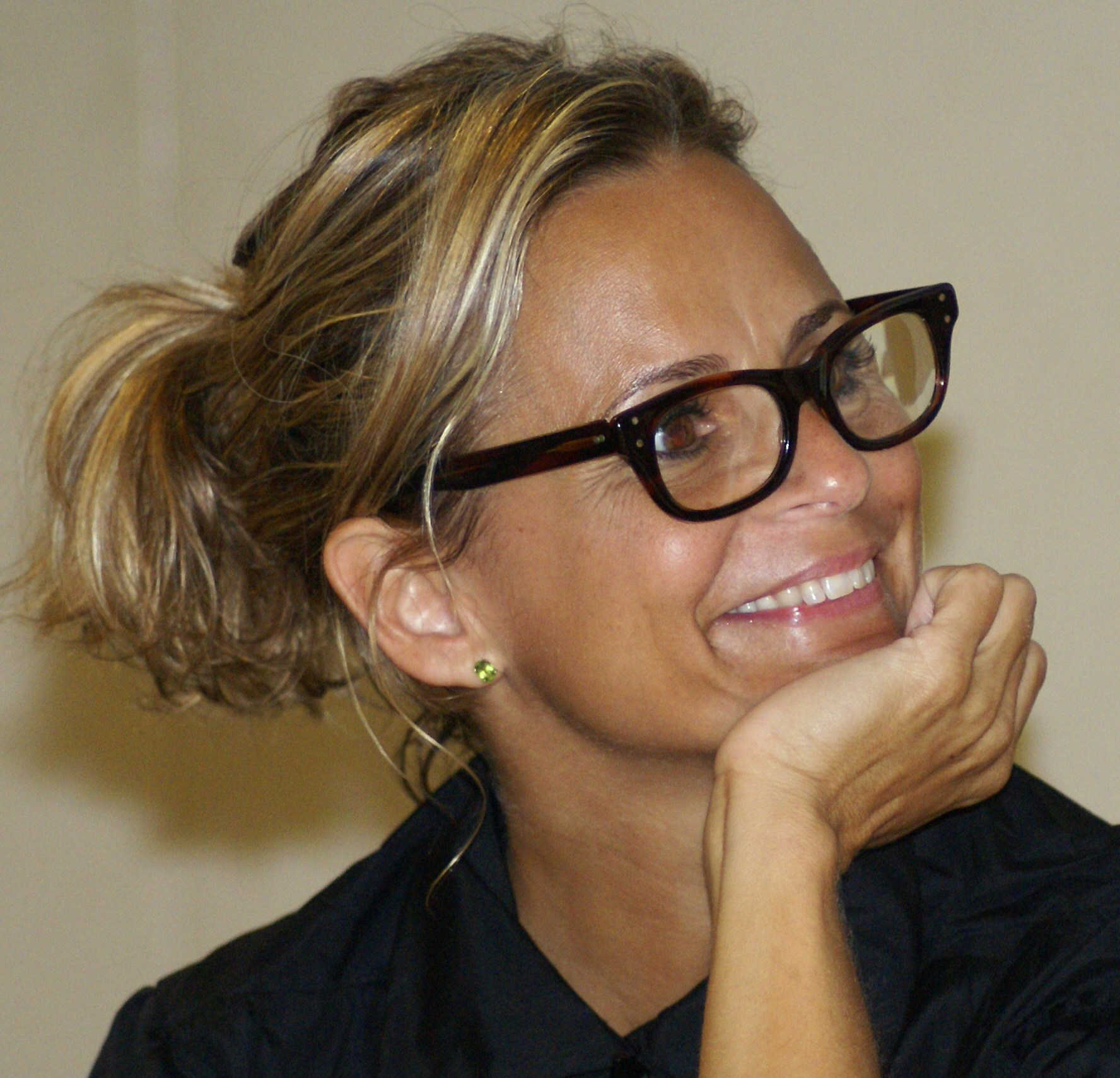
Amy Sedaris (pictured in 2008) voiced Princess Carolyn

Princess Carolyn pulls BoJack Horseman out of a week-long bender after Diane Nguyen's engagement to Mr. Peanutbutter, getting BoJack a commercial shoot for a bourbon manufacturer. As her agency merges with her rival Vanessa Gekko's, she loses her client Cate Blanchett and a project about Eva Braun to Gekko. When BoJack ditches the bourbon shoot to go on a date with her, leaving Todd Chavez to do it, Princess Carolyn finds herself enjoying it until BoJack gets another call from former friend Herb Kazzaz, prompting him to leave to go visit Herb. Distraught, Princess Carolyn barely manages to win back the Eva Braun project and manages to secure BoJack a role in the upcoming movie about the movie based on the Hollywood (now called "Hollywoo") D (part of the Hollywood Sign). She calls BoJack while he drives back from Herb's, but he dismisses her. Miserable, as she sends her assistant Laura home for the night, Princess Carolyn stares out her office window at the city below as her phone alarm wishes her a happy fortieth birthday.

== Cast ==
Voice roles throughout the episode:

- Will Arnett as BoJack Horseman (main)
- Amy Sedaris as Princess Carolyn (main)
- Aaron Paul as Todd Chavez (main)
- Kevin Bigley as Quentin Tarantulino (guest appearance, parody of Quentin Tarantino) and Cameron Crow (parody of Cameron Crowe)
- Rachel Bloom as Laura (guest)
- Raphael Bob-Waksberg as Charley Witherspoon (guest)
- Kristin Chenoweth as Vanessa Gekko (guest)
- Stephen Colbert as Mr. Witherspoon (guest)
- Adam Conover as Paparazzi Blue-Jay (guest)
- Dave Segal as Paparazzi Robin (guest)
- J. K. Simmons as Lenny Turteltaub (guest)
- Stanley Tucci as Herb Kazzaz (guest)

== Production ==
The episode was written by Joe Lawson in his first writing credit in the series; Lawson has subsequently written other BoJack Horseman episodes, such as "Start Spreading the News", "After The Party", and "Stop The Presses". It was directed by Martin Cendreda and produced by Alex Bulkley and Corey Campodonico. The episode was released on Netflix on August 22, 2014, alongside the rest of season one. It was released on DVD and Blu-ray on July 30, 2019, in the BoJack Horseman: Seasons One & Two – Collector's Edition set. This is the first episode in the series to not feature the usual closing theme, instead playing "Impossible" by Lyla Foy.

Creator and showrunner of the series Raphael Bob-Waksberg called the ending one of his favourite moments on the show, saying the ending "is a joke, but it's a very dark, sad joke". He said the episode is the first not told from BoJack's perspective, which Netflix was originally sceptical about. In response to Netflix wanting BoJack to be in the episode more, they came up with having BoJack put a cardboard cutout version of himself into Princess Carolyn's office which says a Jerry Maguire (1996) quote whenever anyone walks by. Bob-Waksberg called it a "tongue-in-cheek way to attack a note" but said it helped the episode. Bob-Waksberg said the episode was a bit of tribute to filmmaker Cameron Crowe, director and writer of Jerry Maguire and 1989's Say Anything... (which the episode title references). He said Lawson is a big fan of Crowe and they requested Crowe make a cameo appearance. However, Crowe declined as he said he was too busy editing Aloha (2015). The character of Cameron Crow in "Say Anything" is instead voiced by Kevin Bigley.

In December 2021, Bob-Waksberg tweeted he had been asked to remove a scene featuring a joke about David Fincher by Netflix originally planned to be in "Say Anything". According to Bob-Waksberg, it was because "they were worried it might upset David Fincher" or that they did not think it was that funny. Fincher has previously worked with Netflix on shows like Mindhunter and House of Cards. Bob-Waksberg said he was content with receiving feedback from Netflix and in retrospect considers the scene "dumb". He went on to say "My point was it's silly for a network to pretend their hands are tied when it comes to the content they put on their network. Good pushback and feedback (if it's good!) makes art better..." After 100 donations from his followers totalling more than $2000 to Trans Lifeline, he released the screenplay of the scene which features David Fincher and Princess Carolyn talking to each other after Fincher is kicked off his film.

== Reception ==
"Say Anything" received positive reviews from critics with praise for its jokes and storytelling. The episode was called a turning point in the series and the title character with a darker ending. Rob Humanick from Slant ranked "Say Anything" as the sixth-best episode of the entire series.

Les Chappell of The A.V. Club, in a review in 2017, opined that one significant reason the show is improving with each episode is that it devotes numerous episodes to its interesting side characters. Chappell said "Say Anything" is the best early exploration of this, writing that Princess Carolyn is perhaps its best character. She went on to say that BoJack Horseman exhibits "two strengths in its early episodes, its unique twist on show business and the emotional scars on its cast members, and 'Say Anything' gets top mileage out of both". Slate's Marissa Martinelli called the episode a turning point in the series and the title character, saying it shows us BoJack is not just a "selfish jerk" but is instead a "barely scabbed-over wound of a person" who has received hurt and is now inflicting on those around him. Martinelli went on to say it is the first time the show inflicted hurt in a real way, as opposed to "cartoonish". Chappell applauded "Say Anything" saying it gave the show an increased level of storytelling.

According to Alec Bojalad of Den of Geek, the episode has 191 jokes, meaning an average of 7.53 jokes per minute. Bojalad commended the debut of the character Charley Witherspoon (voiced by Raphael Bob-Waksberg) saying he had the best dialogue joke and visual joke in the episode. Chappell praised Joe Lawson's writing of jokes applauding both their high frequency and quality.

Chappell noted Amy Sedaris's increased depth of voice acting in "Say Anything". She and Humanick gave moderate praise to Stephen Colbert's voice acting as Mr. Witherspoon. Chappell criticized the episode's immediate dismissal of the blackmail plot. She said it was built in three previous episodes but is shut down by Vanessa with legal statutes. She went on to say "The writers were going for something when they introduced it, but as an ongoing arc it never achieved its true potential." Bojalad praised the ending as both "equally tragic and somehow darkly hilarious". Chappell called the ending a "deeply melancholy moment" with no sign of dark comedy. Chappell added: "All the episodes to date have ended on darkly comic punchlines or moments of foreshadowing. This? There's nothing funny about this."
