= 69th Writers Guild of America Awards =

69th WGA Awards
- Date: February 19, 2017
- Organized by: Writers Guild of America, East and the Writers Guild of America, West

The 69th Writers Guild of America Awards honor the best in film, television, radio and video-game writing of 2016. Winners were announced on February 19, 2017, at Beverly Hilton Hotel, Beverly Hills, California. The nominations for Television, New Media, Radio, News and Promotional Writing were announced on December 5, 2016, while, the Theatrical and Documentary Screenplay nominees were announced on January 4, 2017, and the Videogame Writing nominees were announced on January 12, 2017.

The show was hosted by Patton Oswalt.

== Winners and nominees ==
Winners are listed first and in bold.

=== Film ===
Best Original Screenplay
- **Moonlight (A24) – Barry Jenkins; story by Tarell Alvin McCraney** †† (Note: †† indicates the winner of the Academy Award for Best Adapted Screenplay which in this case was nominated and won in Best Original Screenplay at WGA.)
  - Hell or High Water (CBS Films) – Taylor Sheridan
  - La La Land (Lionsgate) – Damien Chazelle
  - Loving (Focus Features) – Jeff Nichols
  - Manchester by the Sea (Amazon Studios/Roadside Attractions) – Kenneth Lonergan† (Note: † indicates the winner of the Academy Award for Best Original Screenplay.)
Best Adapted Screenplay
- **Arrival (Paramount Pictures) – Eric Heisserer; based on the story "Story of Your Life" by Ted Chiang**
  - Deadpool (20th Century Fox) – Rhett Reese and Paul Wernick; based on the X-Men comic book character created by Fabian Nicieza and Rob Liefeld
  - Fences (Paramount Pictures) – August Wilson; based on his play
  - Hidden Figures (20th Century Fox) – Allison Schroeder and Theodore Melfi; based on the book by Margot Lee Shetterly
  - Nocturnal Animals (Focus Features) – Tom Ford; based on the novel Tony and Susan by Austin Wright
Best Documentary Screenplay
- **Command and Control (American Experience Films) – Robert Kenner and Eric Schlosser, story by Brian Pearle and Kim Roberts; based on the book by Schlosser**
  - Author: The JT LeRoy Story (Amazon Studios) – Jeff Feuerzeig
  - Zero Days (Magnolia Pictures) – Alex Gibney

=== Television ===
Drama Series
- **The Americans (FX) – Peter Ackerman, Tanya Barfield, Joshua Brand, Joel Fields, Stephen Schiff, Joe Weisberg, Tracey Scott Wilson**
  - Better Call Saul (AMC) – Vince Gilligan, Peter Gould, Gennifer Hutchison, Bradley Paul, Thomas Schnauz, Gordon Smith
  - Game of Thrones (HBO) – David Benioff, Bryan Cogman, Dave Hill, D. B. Weiss
  - Stranger Things (Netflix) – Paul Dichter, Justin Doble, The Duffer Brothers, Jessica Mecklenburg, Jessie Nickson-Lopez, Alison Tatlock
  - Westworld (HBO) – Ed Brubaker, Bridget Carpenter, Dan Dietz, Halley Gross, Lisa Joy, Katherine Lingenfelter, Dominic Mitchell, Jonathan Nolan, Roberto Patino, Daniel T. Thomsen, Charles Yu
Comedy Series
- **Atlanta (FX) – Donald Glover, Stephen Glover, Stefani Robinson, Paul Simms**
  - Silicon Valley (HBO) – Megan Amram, Alec Berg, Donick Cary, Adam Countee, Jonathan Dotan, Mike Judge, Carrie Kemper, John Levenstein, Dan Lyons, Carson Mell, Dan O'Keefe, Clay Tarver, Ron Weiner
  - Transparent (Amazon Studios) – Arabella Anderson, Bridget Bedard, Micah Fitzerman-Blue, Noah Harpster, Jessi Klein, Stephanie Kornick, Ethan Kuperberg, Ali Liebegott, Our Lady J, Faith Soloway, Joey Soloway
  - Unbreakable Kimmy Schmidt (Netflix) – Emily Altman, Robert Carlock, Azie Mira Dungey, Tina Fey, Lauren Gurganous, Sam Means, Dylan Morgan, Marlena Rodriguez, Dan Rubin, Meredith Scardino, Josh Siegal, Allison Silverman, Leila Strachan
  - Veep (HBO) – Rachel Axler, Sean Gray, Alex Gregory, Peter Huyck, Eric Kenward, Billy Kimball, Steve Koren, David Mandel, Jim Margolis, Lew Morton, Georgia Pritchett, Will Smith, Alexis Wilkinson
New Series
- **Atlanta (FX) – Donald Glover, Stephen Glover, Stefani Robinson, Paul Simms**
  - Better Things (FX) – Pamela Adlon, Louis C.K., Cindy Chupack, Gina Fattore
  - Stranger Things (Netflix) – Paul Dichter, Justin Doble, The Duffer Brothers, Jessica Mecklenburg, Jessie Nickson-Lopez, Alison Tatlock
  - This Is Us (NBC) – Isaac Aptaker, Elizabeth Berger, Bekah Brunstetter, Dan Fogelman, Vera Herbert, Joe Lawson, Kay Oyegun, Aurin Squire, K.J. Steinberg, Donald Todd
  - Westworld (HBO) – Ed Brubaker, Bridget Carpenter, Dan Dietz, Halley Gross, Lisa Joy, Katherine Lingenfelter, Dominic Mitchell, Jonathan Nolan, Roberto Patino, Daniel T. Thomsen, Charles Yu
Long Form – Original
- **Confirmation (HBO) – Susannah Grant**
  - American Crime (ABC) – Julie Hébert, Sonay Hoffman, Keith Huff, Stacy A. Littlejohn, Kirk A. Moore, Davy Perez, Diana Son
  - Harley and the Davidsons (Discovery Channel) – Seth Fisher, Nick Schenk, Evan Wright
  - Surviving Compton: Dre, Suge & Michel'le (Lifetime) – Dianne Houston
Long Form – Adapted
- **The People v. O. J. Simpson: American Crime Story (FX) – Scott Alexander, Joe Robert Cole, D.V. DeVincentis, Maya Forbes, Larry Karaszewski, Wally Wolodarsky, Based on the book The Run of His Life: The People v. O.J. Simpson by Jeffrey Toobin**
  - 11.22.63 (Hulu) – Bridget Carpenter, Brigitte Hales, Joe Henderson, Brian Nelson, Quinton Peeple, Based on the book 11/22/63 by Stephen King
  - Madoff (ABC) – Ben Robbins, Based on the book The Madoff Chronicles: Inside the Secret World of Bernie and Ruth by Brian Ross
  - The Night Of (HBO) – Richard Price and Steven Zaillian, Based on the TV show Criminal Justice created by Peter Moffat
  - Roots (HBO) – Lawrence Konner, Alison McDonald, Charles Murray, Mark Rosenthal, Based on the book Roots: The Saga of an American Family by Alex Haley
Short Form New Media – Original
- **"The Party" – The Commute (YouTube.com) – Linsey Stewart & Dane Clark**
  - "Episode 101" – Now We're Talking (go90.com) – Tug Coker & Tommy Dewey
  - "Escape the Room" – Life Ends at 30 (vimeo.com) – Michael Field
  - "Itsy Bitsy Spider" Episode 1 – Thug Passion (vimeo.com) – Motrya Tomycz
Short Form New Media – Adapted
- **"Part 4" – Fear the Walking Dead: Passage (amc.com) – Lauren Signorino & Mike Zunic**
  - "Under Siege" – The Strain (fxnetworks.com) – Bradley Thompson & David Weddle
Animation
- **"Stop the Presses" – BoJack Horseman (Netflix) – Joe Lawson**
  - "Barthood" – The Simpsons (Fox) – Dan Greaney
  - "First Day of Rule" – Elena of Avalor (Disney Channel) – Craig Gerber
  - "Fish Out of Water" – BoJack Horseman (Netflix) – Elijah Aron & Jordan Young
  - "A Princess on Lothal" – Star Wars Rebels (Disney XD) – Steven Melching
Episodic Drama
- **"The Trip" – This Is Us (NBC) – Vera Herbert**
  - "Gloves Off" – Better Call Saul (AMC) – Gordon Smith
  - "I Am a Storm" – Shameless (Showtime) – Sheila Callaghan
  - "Klick" – Better Call Saul (AMC) – Heather Marion & Vince Gilligan
  - "Switch" – Better Call Saul (AMC) – Thomas Schnauz
  - "The Winds of Winter" – Game of Thrones (HBO) – David Benioff & D. B. Weiss
Episodic Comedy
- **"Kimmy Goes on a Playdate!" – Unbreakable Kimmy Schmidt (Netflix) – Robert Carlock**
  - "Kimmy Finds Her Mom!" – Unbreakable Kimmy Schmidt (Netflix) – Tina Fey & Sam Means
  - "Pilot" – One Mississippi (Amazon Studios) – Diablo Cody & Tig Notaro
  - "R-A-Y-C-Ray-Cation" – Speechless (ABC) – Carrie Rosen & Seth Kurland
  - "Streets on Lock" – Atlanta (FX) – Stephen Glover
  - "A Taste of Zephyria" – Son of Zorn (FOX) – Dan Mintz
Comedy/Variety – Talk Series
- **Last Week Tonight with John Oliver (HBO) – Kevin Avery, Tim Carvell, Josh Gondelman, Dan Gurewitch, Geoff Haggerty, Jeff Maurer, John Oliver, Scott Sherman, Will Tracy, Jill Twiss, Juli Weiner**
  - The Daily Show with Trevor Noah (Comedy Central) – Dan Amira, David Angelo, Steve Bodow, Devin Delliquanti, Zach DiLanzo, Travon Free, Hallie Haglund, David Kibuuka, Matt Koff, Adam Lowitt, Dan McCoy, Lauren Sarver Means, Trevor Noah, Joe Opio, Zhubin Parang, Owen Parson, Daniel Radosh, Michelle Wolf
  - Late Night with Seth Meyers (NBC) – Jermaine Affonso, Alex Baze, Bryan Donaldson, Sal Gentile, Matt Goldich, Jenny Hagel, Allison Hord, Mike Karnell, Andrew Law, John Lutz, Aparna Nancherla, Chioke Nassor, Seth Meyers, Ian Morgan, Conner O'Malley, Seth Reiss, Amber Ruffin, Mike Scollins, Mike Shoemaker, Ben Warheit, Michelle Wolf
  - The Late Show with Stephen Colbert (CBS) – Mike Brumm, Nate Charny, Aaron Cohen, Stephen Colbert, Cullen Crawford, Paul Dinello, Eric Drysdale, Ariel Dumas, Glenn Eichler, Gabe Gronli, Barry Julien, Jay Katsir, Daniel Kibblesmith, Matt Lappin, Opus Moreschi, Tom Purcell, Jen Spyra, Brian Stack
Comedy/Variety – Sketch Series
- **Saturday Night Live (NBC) – Head Writers: Rob Klein, Bryan Tucker; Writers: James Anderson, Fred Armisen, Jeremy Beiler, Chris Belair, Megan Callahan, Michael Che, Mikey Day, Jim Downey, Tina Fey, Fran Gillespie, Sudi Green, Tim Herlihy, Steve Higgins, Colin Jost, Zach Kanin, Chris Kelly, Erik Kenward, Paul Masella, Dave McCary, Dennis McNicholas, Seth Meyers, Lorne Michaels, Josh Patten, Paula Pell, Katie Rich, Tim Robinson, Sarah Schneider, Pete Schultz, Streeter Seidell, Dave Sirus, Emily Spivey, Andrew Steele, Will Stephen, Kent Sublette**
  - Documentary Now! (IFC) – Bill Hader, John Mulaney, Seth Meyers
  - Inside Amy Schumer (Comedy Central) – Kim Caramele, Kyle Dunnigan, Jessi Klein, Michael Lawrence, Kurt Metzger, Christine Nangle, Claudia O'Doherty, Dan Powell, Tami Sagher, Amy Schumer
  - Maya & Marty (NBC) – Head Writers: Mikey Day, Matt Roberts, Bryan Tucker; Writers: Eli Bauman, Jeremy Beiler, Chris Belair, Hallie Cantor, David Feldman, R. J. Fried, Melissa Hunter, Paul Masella, Tim McAuliffe, John Mulaney, Diallo Riddle, Maya Rudolph, Bashir Salahuddin, Marika Sawyer, Streeter Seidell, Martin Short, Emily Spivey, Steve Young
  - Nathan for You (Comedy Central) – Leo Allen, Nathan Fielder, Adam Locke-Norton, Eric Notarnicola
Comedy/Variety (Music, Awards, Tributes) – Specials
- **Triumph's Election Special (Hulu) – Andy Breckman, Josh Comers, Rajan Desai, David Feldman, R. J. Fried, Jarrett Grode, Ben Joseph, Matthew Kirsch, Michael Koman, Mike Lawrence, Brian Reich, Craig Rowin, Robert Smigel, Zach Smilovitz, David Taylor, Andrew Weinberg; Additional Materials by Ray James, Jesse Joyce, Jason Reich, Alex Scordelis**
  - 68th Primetime Emmy Awards (ABC) – Jack Allison, Tony Barbieri, Jonathan Bines, Joelle Boucai, Robert Cohen, Gary Greenberg, Josh Halloway, Sal Iacono, Eric Immerman, Jimmy Kimmel, Bess Kalb, Jeff Loveness, Jon Macks, Molly McNearney, Danny Ricker, Jeff Stilson, Joe Strazzullo, Alexis Wilkinson
  - 73rd Golden Globe Awards (NBC) – Barry Adelman; Special Material by Dave Boone, Ricky Gervais, Jon Macks, Matthew Robinson
  - 88th Academy Awards (ABC) – Dave Boone, Billy Kimball; Special Material by Scott Aukerman, Rodney Barnes, Neil Campbell, Matthew Claybrooks, Lance Crouther, Mike Ferrucci, Langston Kerman, Jon Macks, Steve O’Donnell, Nimesh Patel, Vanessa Ramos, Chris Rock, Frank Sebastiano, Chuck Sklar, Jeff Stilson, Michelle Wolf
Quiz and Audience Participation
- **Hollywood Game Night (NBC) – Head Writer: Grant Taylor; Writers: Michael Agbabian, Alex Chauvin, Ann Slichter and Dwight D. Smith**
  - Jeopardy! (ABC) – John Duarte, Harry Friedman, Mark Gaberman, Deborah Griffin, Michele Loud, Robert McClenaghan, Jim Rhine, Steve D. Tamerius, Billy Wisse
Daytime Drama
- **General Hospital (ABC) – Shelly Altman, Anna Theresa Cascio, Andrea Archer Compton, Suzanne Flynn, Janet Iacobuzio, Elizabeth Korte, Daniel James O'Connor, Jean Passanante, Dave Rupel, Katherine Schock, Scott Sickles, Chris Van Etten, Christopher Whitesell**
Children's Script – Episodic and Specials
- **"Mel vs. The Night Mare of Normal Street" – Gortimer Gibbon's Life on Normal Street (Amazon Studios) – Laurie Parres**
  - "Girl Meets Commonism" – Girl Meets World (Disney Channel) – Joshua Jacobs & Michael Jacobs
  - "Just Add Mom" – Just Add Magic (Amazon Studios) – John-Paul Nickel
  - "Mucko Polo, Grouch Explorer" – Sesame Street (HBO) – Belinda Ward
Children's Long Form
- **Once Upon a Sesame Street Christmas (HBO) – Geri Cole & Ken Scarborough**
  - Dance Camp (YouTube.com) – Teleplay by Nick Turner & Rex New and Cameron Fay, Story by Nick Turner & Rex New
  - R.L. Stine's Monsterville: Cabinet of Souls (Freeform) – Billy Brown & Dan Angel

==== Documentary ====
Documentary Script – Current Events
- **"The Choice 2016" – Frontline (PBS) – Michael Kirk & Mike Wiser**
- **"Inside Assad's Syria" – Frontline (PBS) – Martin Smith**
  - "Chasing Heroin" – Frontline (PBS) – Marcela Gaviria
Documentary Script – Other than Current Events
- **"Part One" – Jackie Robinson (PBS) – David McMahon & Sarah Burns**
  - "American Reds" – (WPTS Dayton) – Richard Wormser
  - "Netanyahu at War" – Frontline (PBS) – Michael Kirk & Mike Wiser

==== News ====
TV News Script – Regularly Scheduled, Bulletin, or Breaking Report
- **"Muhammad Ali: Remembering A Legend" – 48 Hours (CBS News) – Jerry Cipriano, John Craig Wilson**
  - "Ambush In Dallas" – World News Tonight With David Muir (ABC News) – David Bloch, Karen Mooney, David Muir, David Schoetz
  - "Brussels Under Attack" – World News Tonight With David Muir (ABC News) – David Bloch, Karen Mooney, David Muir, David Schoetz
TV News Script – Analysis, Feature, or Commentary
- **"CBS Sunday Morning Almanac" – CBS Sunday Morning (CBS) – Thomas A. Harris**

=== Radio ===
Radio Documentary
- **"Chernobyl: 30 Years Later" (ABC News Radio) – Andrew Evans**
  - "Summer of 2016" (CBS Radio News) – David Shapiro
Radio News Script – Regularly Scheduled, Bulletin, or Breaking Report
- **"World News This Week, August 26, 2016" (ABC News Radio) – Tara Gimbel Tanis**
  - "6:40am News, November 13, 2015" (CBS Radio News) – Philip Pilato
  - "Legends of the Game" (CBS Radio News) – Thomas A. Sabella
  - "Muhammad Ali: A Tribute to Greatness" (CBS Radio News) – Gail Lee
Radio News Script – Analysis, Feature, or Commentary
- **"Morley Safer: A Journalist’s Life" (CBS Radio News) – Gail Lee**
  - "Dishin Digital on WCBS-AM" (WCBS-AM Radio) – Robert Hawley
  - "Vin Scully" (KNX) – Jerry Edling
  - "Vin Scully Hangs Up The Mic" (ABC News Radio) – Andrew Evans

=== Promotional Writing ===
On-Air Promotion – Television, New Media, or Radio
- **"CBS On-Air Reel" (CBS On-Air Promotion) – Molly J. Neylan**
  - "Big Brother Over The Top Launch & NCIS: Special Agent Tony Dinozzo’s Top Moments" (CBS) – Erial Tompkins
  - "The Dollmaker, Halloween" (NBC) – Jennifer H. Kaas
  - “Limitless Promos 15/16” (CBS On-Air Promotion) – Jessica Katzenstein
  - "Mom" (CBS) – Dan Greenberger
Television Graphic Art and Animation
- **"The Real History of Cinco de Mayo" (Gawker Media Group) (YouTube.com) – Elisa Solinas**

=== Videogaming Writing ===
Outstanding Achievement in Videogame Writing
- **Uncharted 4: A Thief's End (Naughty Dog) – Neil Druckmann, Josh Scherr; Additional Writing: Tom Bissell, Ryan James**
  - Call of Duty: Infinite Warfare (Activision) – Brian Bloom
  - Far Cry Primal (Ubisoft) – Lead Writers: Ian C. Ryan, Kevin Shortt; Writers: Lynne Kamm, Susan Patrick; story by: Jean-Sébastien Décant, Ryan, Shortt
  - Mr. Robot:1.51exfiltrati0n (Night School Studio) – Adam Hines; story by Hines, Kor Adana
