= Stars (Janis Ian song) =

Song by Janis Ian
- Released: February 1974
- Recorded: March 1972 – 1973
- Studio: 914 Sound Studios; Sound Recorders, Los Angeles; Sound Studios, New York State
- Genre: Folk
- Length: 7:12
- Label: Columbia
- Producer(s): Brooks Arthur

"Stars" is the title track on the sixth studio album of American singer-songwriter Janis Ian. The song is a sombre guitar ballad about the pitfalls, fleetingness, and consequences of fame.

== Nina Simone version ==
Jazz and blues singer Nina Simone performed a modified version of "Stars" live at the 1976 Montreux Jazz Festival held in Montreux, Switzerland. Simone's version was played on the piano, included new lyrics, and had a more somber tone than that of Ian's, fitting the mental and financial struggles the artist was facing in the decline of her career. A recording of Simone's performance was preserved.

Simone released another rendition of "Stars" in her live compilation album Let it Be Me (1987) and posthumously, the Montreux version, in Nina Simone: The Montreux Years (2021).

Simone's Montreux cover version was played during the final moments of the season 3 finale of the Netflix adult cartoon BoJack Horseman. Jen Chaney wrote in New York magazine that the way the season's finale "unfold[s] the way it does to Nina Simone’s 'Stars,' is utterly crushing. It’s the most heartbreaking thing I’ve ever seen in an animated series." The song was included in the show's soundtrack album.
