= Fish Out of Water (BoJack Horseman) =

- BoJack Horseman episode
- BoJack looks around the underwater city; the animators made sure that certain colors were prioritized to emphasize that the episode took place underwater.
- Episode no.: Season 3 Episode 4
- Directed by: Mike Hollingsworth
- Written by: Elijah Aron; Jordan Young
- Original release date: July 22, 2016
- Running time: 26 minutes

Episode chronology
← Previous "BoJack Kills"	Next → "Love And/Or Marriage"
- BoJack Horseman (season 3)

"Fish Out of Water" is the fourth episode of the third season of the American animated television series BoJack Horseman. Written by Elijah Aron and Jordan Young, and directed by Mike Hollingsworth, it was released in the United States, along with the rest of season three, via Netflix on July 22, 2016. The series follows the life of former television star BoJack Horseman, an anthropomorphic horse residing in Hollywood. "Fish Out of Water" features BoJack traveling to a film festival in the ocean, where he is unable to communicate with any sea creatures.

The episode features less than three minutes of audible dialogue, a narrative element that came up when the writers realized how difficult it would be for BoJack to communicate underwater. Pieces of media such as Lost in Translation, Fantasia, an episode of Futurama, and Porky's Duck Hunt came up as inspiration during the episode's production.

Upon the season's release, "Fish Out of Water" received critical acclaim. The episode was listed twenty-sixth on Rolling Stone's list of the one-hundred best television episodes of all time. Critics gave praise towards the episode's ability to give a coherent narrative, despite its significant lack of audible dialogue. It received several award nominations, winning Special Distinction for a TV Series at the 2017 Annecy International Animation Film Festival.

== Plot ==
At the 20K Leagues Sublines plane, BoJack is sent by his publicist, Ana Spanakopita who is in a fancy restaurant with a housefly waiter, to the world's biggest underwater film festival to promote Secretariat, but after a mental breakdown that infuriates most passengers, including making a baby reticulated python cry, he is electrocuted with a taser by an electric eel. When he arrives, he notices that the Secretariat director, a middle-aged human woman named Kelsey Jannings, is also attending. Ashamed of costing Kelsey her job directing the film, BoJack panics: not only will he have to have an awkward confrontation, he will have to do it underwater, where speaking is inhibited by his helmet. BoJack goes to the festival lobby where press events are underway. An anglerfish photographer and a neon tetra journalist take his picture, so he poses for them—giving them the thumbs-up sign, not knowing that this gesture is offensive in Pacific Ocean City.

He notices Kelsey sadly trying to drum up interest in her movie, so he tries to write her an apology note, but she disappears before he can give it to her. BoJack is pushed onto a bus driven by a stonefish by a group of sardine businessman and falls asleep; soon after, he is asked to help a male seahorse give birth, and becomes stranded far from the city. He starts to walk back to the festival before he realizes that one of the baby seahorses clung to him, so he reluctantly decides to find its father. Following many misadventures including stealing milk to calm the baby from a great white shark with a crowbar named Tim Jaws that owns a convenience store, falling into the deep sea where he finds glowing sea anemones after meeting a multi-eyed jellyfish and entering a taffy factory where the baby´s father works while escaping from barracuda guards led by a crayfish, he reunites the baby with its father, but it turns out that it was not missed. The seahorse father invites BoJack in for dinner and even offers him money, but BoJack declines and leaves depressed.

BoJack catches a London-style taxi being drive by a manta ray back to the hotel. En route, he writes a heartfelt apology note to Kelsey. He arrives too late to attend the premiere, so he returns to the hotel just in time for the afterparty, where he learns that Secretariat was a huge hit. As Kelsey leaves the party, BoJack runs after the New York-style taxicab being drive by a Squidward-like octopus that Kesley is in, but by the time he reaches her window the ink on his note has become runny and blurred. Kelsey speeds off without knowing what he wanted to say. As BoJack stands at a crosswalk, a man with a helmet yells at him by pressing a button on the collar. Realizing that he could speak the whole time, BoJack exclaims in anger.

== Production ==
=== Development ===
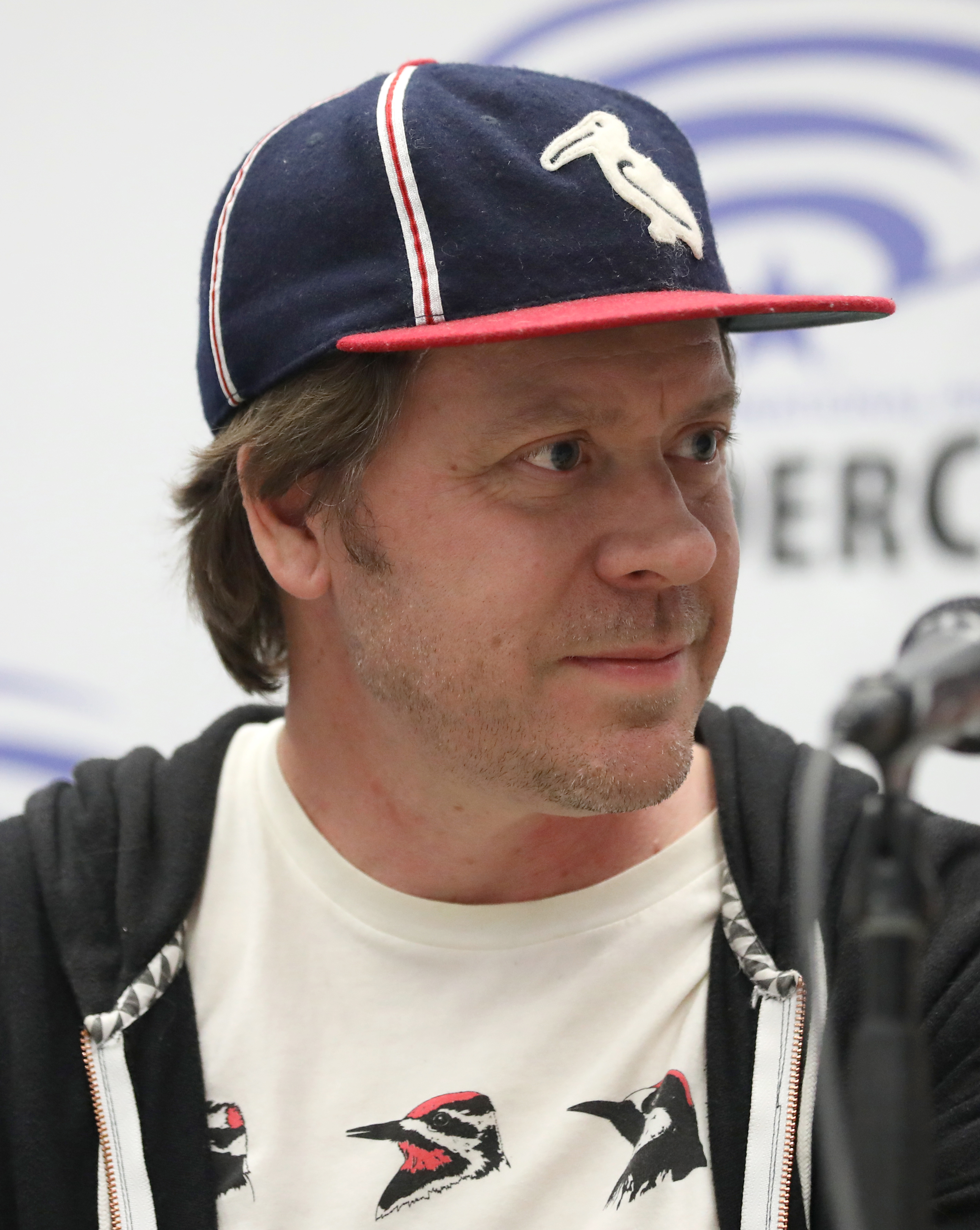
Mike Hollingsworth (pictured) directed "Fish Out of Water"

"Fish Out of Water" was written by Elijah Aron and Jordan Young, and directed by Mike Hollingsworth. According to series creator Raphael Bob-Waksberg, the idea for the episode stemmed from a desire to create an episode that relied more on visual storytelling than dialogue. Hollingsworth had "always wanted" to do an underwater episode, and the decision to create one came early in the production of Season 3. They eventually realized how difficult it would be to figure out how the characters would communicate with each other in an underwater setting; the crew eventually settled on having the characters' speech be garbled. The episode contains less than three minutes of audible dialogue.

To help guide the episode's direction—and to avoid inadvertently borrowing its humor—Bob-Waksberg watched the Futurama episode "The Deep South", which also takes place underwater. Netflix was initially hesitant towards the episode, due to its differing approach from the series' usual structure. In an attempt to convince the network to allow the episode, Bob-Waksberg sent Netflix an email listing other pieces of media that used limited dialogue and received praise for doing so, including the Buffy the Vampire Slayer episode "Hush" and the 2011 film The Artist. The network eventually came around towards the idea, and ended up "lov[ing] it", according to Bob-Waksberg. Production designer Lisa Hanawalt described the episode as "our Fantasia". The sound effects of the episode were prioritized to showcase BoJack's emotions; they used a higher pitched sound when BoJack was surprised or angry, and a calmer pitch during his moments of relaxation.

=== Writing ===
Due to the lack of dialogue, creating a script for the episode caused difficulties in its production. Jordan Young and Elijah Aron wrote the script without any dialogue, instead writing based on "description and direction". This made it difficult to figure out how long the episode would be. Hollingsworth acted out the script to see how long each story beat would be. Because of concerns around the episode's length, a full act was removed, which Bob-Waksberg said he "do[esn't] miss". Lost in Translation was used as a template for BoJack's inability to communicate with any sea creatures in the episode, as the film also centers around someone navigating a foreign area. The emotional content of the episode took priority in its script, and they delegated a significant portion of that aspect to the animation department rather than the usual writers room, as each action was purposefully left vague to allow for more creativity in the animation.

=== Animation ===
To further emphasize that the episode takes place underwater, certain colors and background elements were prioritized. Another issue came from the episode's lighting; there was trouble in making the episode look like it was taking place underwater without simply putting blue filter over everything. They made sure to emphasize glitter and sparkling as a means to overcome this. Bob-Waksberg described the recounted as "kind of like [making] a new pilot". There was heavy discussion over whether the background fish should walk on the ground or swim. The animation team drew from silent era cartoons as inspiration for the episode's way of telling a story without dialogue; BoJack chasing the baby seahorse was modeled after chase scenes commonly found in older styles of animation. Korean graphic design was a significant influence for the isolation that BoJack experiences while in the water. Instead of using the same design repeatedly for the underwater cars, Hanawalt insisted on multiple different car designs being implemented.

The baby seahorse bouncing off of walls after ingesting an excess of sugar was taken from the animated short film Porky's Duck Hunt, as suggested by Hollingsworth. Hanawalt recounted that the baby seahorse was modelled after Harper, the daughter that BoJack imagines during his drug trip in "Downer Ending"; this was intentionally done as a way to signal that the baby seahorse invoked strong feelings inside BoJack. Within the episode's budget, the staff tried to create as many characters as they could. They reused characters that could co-exist in both land and sea, such as dolphin Sextina Aquafina. The general rules made for the series were broken during the episode's production, particularly the one forbidding interspecies families.

== Release and reception ==
The third season of BoJack Horseman, including "Fish Out of Water", was released on Netflix on July 22, 2016. A soundtrack compiling all songs from the series composed by Jesse Novak, who scored the episode, was released in September 2017. The episode received high praise from critics upon release; it was one of the "much [appreciated]" episodes of the season by critics. Writing for Collider, Jennie Richardson praised the episode for its themes, particularly how it shows BoJack doing a kind act for a stranger during the third season, where BoJack does many selfish things. Jesse David Fox of Vulture praised the episode as "a must-watch", noting that the episode stands on its own, regardless of whether the viewer has seen any other episodes of the series. In 2024, Rolling Stone listed it as the 26th best TV episode of all time, drawing attention to its abundance of sight gags and wordplay while commending the episode for standing on its own without a viewer needing prior knowledge of the series to gain enjoyment from it.

St. Paul Pioneer Press's Bethonie Butler praised the episode for its visuals and creativity, highlighting the humorous ending. Les Chappell, writing for AV Club, described the episode as "nothing short of a masterpiece", suggesting that it is a culmination of both BoJack Horseman's distinctive animation style and its common theme of connection. Joe.ie's Rory Cashin hailed "Fish Out of Water" as one of the greatest television episodes ever made, praising it for delivering a coherent story without using much dialogue. Daniel Harmon of Flood Magazine commended the eloquence of the episode, particularly for its handling of parenthood through BoJack and the baby seahorse's dynamic. Writing for Decider, Kayla Cobb listed "Fish Out of Water" on her list of the show's five best episodes, applauding it for showcasing BoJack's normal behavior in an irregular environment.

=== Accolades ===
In 2017, the episode received a nomination for the Writers Guild of America Award for Television: Animation at the 69th WGA Awards. It ultimately lost to "Stop the Presses", another episode of BoJack Horseman. "Fish Out of Water" was also nominated for Best Animated Television Production at the 44th Annie Awards, losing to an episode of Bob's Burgers. At the 2017 Annecy International Animation Film Festival, the episode won Special Distinction for a TV Series. The episode was also nominated for Sound and Music Editing in TV Animation at the 64th Annual Golden Reel Awards, losing to Albert.
