= Jim Nollman =

American composer (born 1947)

Jim Nollman (born January 1947 in Boston) is an American composer of music for theatre, a conceptual artist, and an environmental activist. He graduated from Tufts University in 1969.

In 1973, he composed a Thanksgiving Day radio piece and recorded himself singing children's songs with three hundred turkeys. He has recorded interspecies music with various other animals. He released several albums on Folkways Records, including Playing Music with Animals: Interspecies Communication of Jim Nollman with 300 Turkeys, 12 Wolves and 20 Orcas.

Nollman directed one of Greenpeace's first overseas projects, at Iki Island, Japan, where fishermen were slaughtering dolphins to compensate for human overfishing. In 1978, Nollman founded Interspecies, which sponsors artists' efforts to communicate with animals through music and art. Its best-known project is a twenty-five-year study using live music to interact with wild orcas off the west coast of Canada.

== Recordings ==
- 1982 Playing Music With Animals (Folkways Records)
- 1997 What The Dolphin Said (Beluga Records)
- 1999 Orca's Greatest Hits (Beluga Records)
- 2006 Belly of the Whale (Important Records)
- 2011 The New Old Time (Red Newt Records)
- 2021 Music for Swimming and Flying (Other Minds Records)

== Publications ==
- 1987 The Man Who Talks to Whales (Sentient Publications, ISBN 0-9710786-2-9), originally published under the title Dolphin Dreamtime: Talking to the Animals (Bantam Books, 1985),
- 1987 Animal Dreaming: The Art of Interspecies Communication (Bantam, ASIN B000TV51S6)
- 1990 Spiritual Ecology: A Guide for Reconnecting with Nature (Bantam, ISBN 0-55334-823-X)
- 1991 Why We Garden: Cultivating A Sense of Place (Sentient Publications, ISBN 1-59181-025-6, Henry Holt & Co., ASIN B000Q1WZLU ISBN 0-80502-719-X)
- 1998 Not Talking to Balooga: Whales and Dolphins (Henry Holt & Co., ISBN 0-80504-575-9)
- 1999 The Charged Border: Where Whales and Humans Meet (Henry Holt & Co., ISBN 0-80505-523-1)
- 2002 The Man Who Talks To Whales: The Art of Interspecies Communications (Sentient Publications, ISBN 0-97107-862-9)
- 2002 The Beluga Café: My Strange Adventures with Art, Music and Whales in the Far North (Sierra Club Books, ISBN 1-57805-087-1)

He has also written essays which are anthologized in several collections of nature writing. He is contributing editor of the interspecies.com whale site.

== See also ==
- Hardy Jones
