= Mike Hollingsworth (animator) =

American artist, animator, and comedian

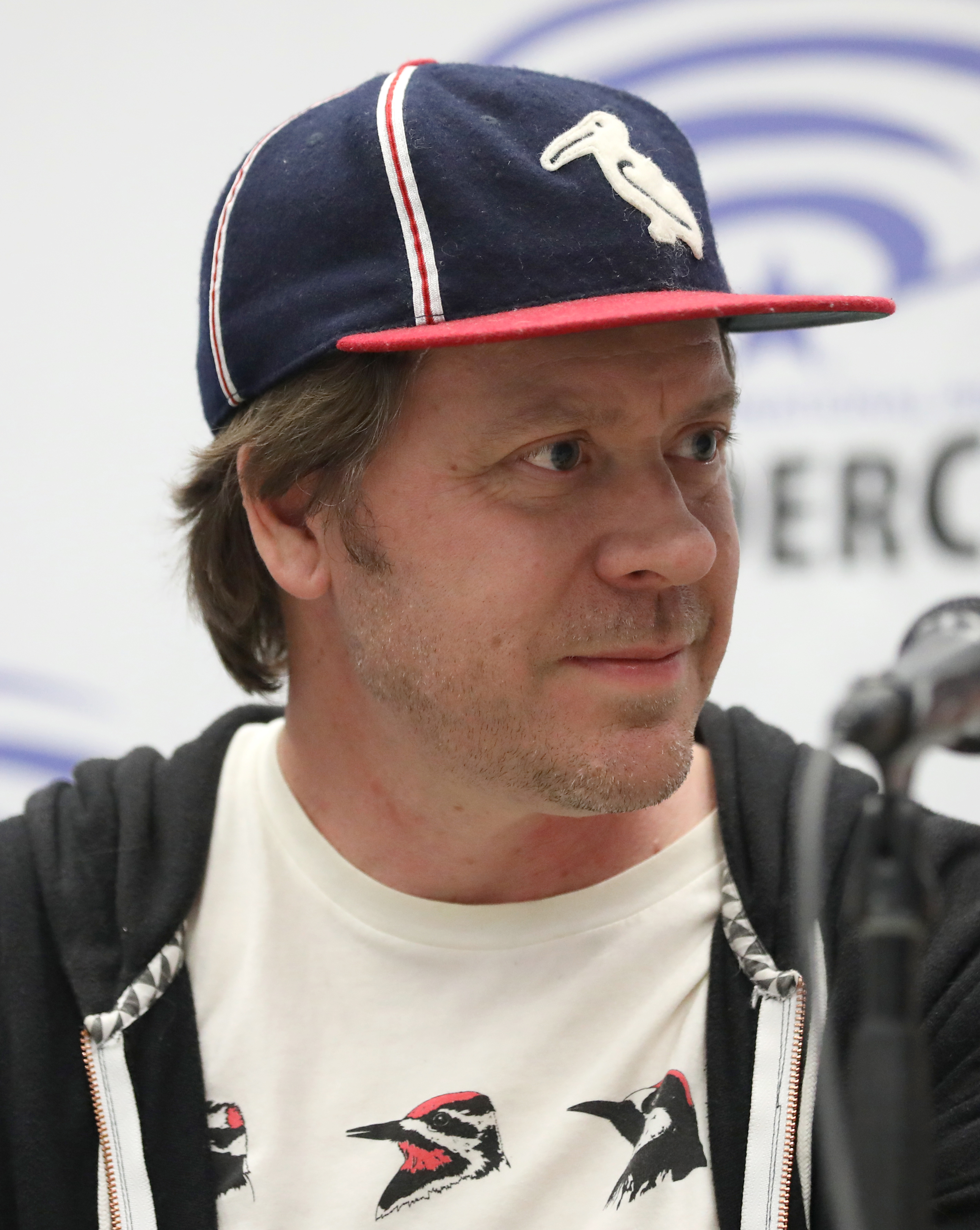
Hollingsworth at the 2024 WonderCon

Mike Hollingsworth (born November 6, 1975) is an American artist, animator, and stand-up comedian. He was the supervising director of BoJack Horseman on Netflix. He also occasionally performed voices for the series. In 2017, the episode "Fish out of Water" that he directed won the "Special Distinction for a TV series" at the Annecy International Animation Festival. It was also cited as the best episode of television for 2016 by Time Magazine.

Hollingsworth has directed for other TV series including Brickleberry and The Life and Times of Tim. He created the web series Nature Break for Shut Up! Cartoons and LOW TIDE on Fuel TV's show Stupidface.
