= BoJack Horseman season 3 =

BoJack Horseman
- Season 3
- Season 3 promotional poster
- Starring: Will Arnett; Amy Sedaris; Alison Brie; Paul F. Tompkins; Aaron Paul
- No. of episodes: 12

Release
- Original network: Netflix
- Original release: July 22, 2016

Season chronology
- ← Previous; Season 2 Next → Season 4

The third season of the animated television series BoJack Horseman premiered on Netflix on July 22, 2016. As with the first two seasons, season 3 consists of 12 episodes.

== Cast and characters ==
=== Main ===
- Will Arnett as BoJack Horseman
- Amy Sedaris as Princess Carolyn
- Alison Brie as Diane Nguyen
- Paul F. Tompkins as Mr. Peanutbutter
- Aaron Paul as Todd Chavez

=== Recurring ===
- Diedrich Bader as Judah Mannowdog
- Maria Bamford as Kelsey Jannings / various
- Angela Bassett as Ana Spanikopita
- Jessica Biel as herself
- Kevin Bigley as Shep von Trapp / Jimmy Fallon
- Rachel Bloom as Laura / various
- Raphael Bob-Waksberg as Charley Witherspoon / various
- Kristin Chenoweth as Vanessa Gekko / Miss Teach-Bot
- Adam Conover as A Ryan Seacrest Type / Bradley Hitler-Smith / various
- Fielding Edlow as Roxie / various
- Raúl Esparza as Ralph Stilton
- Abbi Jacobson as Emily
- Margo Martindale as herself
- Keith Olbermann as Tom Jumbo-Grumbo
- Patton Oswalt as Pinky Penguin / various
- Kristen Schaal as Sarah Lynn / various
- Ben Schwartz as Rutabaga Rabitowitz
- J. K. Simmons as Lenny Turtletaub
- Cedric Yarbrough as Officer Meow-Meow Fuzzyface / various

=== Guest stars ===
- Alan Arkin as J.D. Salinger
- Lake Bell as Katrina Peanutbutter
- Candice Bergen as The Closer
- Kate Berlant as Stage Manager / Human Patron
- Lorraine Bracco as Dr. Janet
- Nicole Byer as Teenage Girl
- Patrick Carney as Jay Zebra
- Jamie Clayton as Lady in Stall / Mom Donkey
- Neil deGrasse Tyson as Planetarium Narrator
- Emily Deschanel as Bones
- Dave Franco as Alexi Brosefino
- Daniele Gaither as Sextina Aquafina
- Jorge Garcia as Jorge Garcia
- Ilana Glazer as Penny Carson
- Kimiko Glenn as Stefani Stilton
- Terry Gross as Diane's Ringtone
- Carla Hall as Spaghetti Scientist Carla Hall
- Jake Johnson as Oxnard
- Wiz Khalifa as Wiz Khalifa
- Greg Kinnear as Greg Kinglear
- Phil LaMarr as various
- Natasha Leggero as Heather
- Jonathan Lethem as Diane's Ringtone
- Melissa Leo as Diane's Mother
- Leonard Maltin as Leonard Maltin
- Jay Mohr as Jurj Clooners / Foggy St. Jerusalem / TV Doctor
- Russell Peters as Network Executive
- Fred Savage as Richie Osborne / Goober
- Anna Deavere Smith as Betty Bruce
- Tessa Thompson as Taneisha
- Baron Vaughn as Waiter / Possum at the Bar / Child Donkey
- Rufus Wainwright as Drinking Bird / The Obertones
- Mara Wilson as Jill Pill
- Jeffrey Wright as Cuddlywhiskers / Father
- "Weird Al" Yankovic as Captain Peanutbutter
- Constance Zimmer as Skinny Gina

== Episodes ==
BoJack Horseman season 3 episodes
No. overall	No. in season	Title	Directed by	Written by	Original release date	Prod. code
26	1	"Start Spreading the News"	J.C. Gonzalez	Joe Lawson	July 22, 2016	301
BoJack, Todd, and Ana Spanakopita go on tour in New York City, where he meets playwright Jill Pill, who asks him to check on an associate of theirs named "Cuddlywhiskers". J.D. Salinger ends his game show, leaving Mr. Peanutbutter without a job, and he returns to pitching costly, nonsensical business ideas. BoJack almost has sex with a reporter against Ana's wishes and becomes uncomfortable, vaguely alluding to the incident in New Mexico (Note: As depicted in "Escape from L.A.".) and admitting his role in Secretariat is fake, (Note: As depicted in "Out to Sea".) which the reporter records. Ana learns of this and takes care of it, and after Secretariat screens to positive reviews, BoJack promises the audience that they are seeing the real him in the role.
27	2	"The BoJack Horseman Show"	Adam Parton	Vera Santamaria	July 22, 2016	302
In 2007, BoJack is dating Princess Carolyn, the secretary to his agent who later takes his job when he quits, and is refusing to take new roles, unable to move on from the success of Horsin' Around. Todd has his first kiss with his friend Emily and the two date, but he becomes uncomfortable when she posits the idea of having sex and flees her house when her dad comes home. Mr. Peanutbutter's second wife Jessica Biel leaves him, and he meets Diane while she caters an event he is speaking at. BoJack meets with Jill and Cuddlywhiskers, a hamster screenwriter, who writes a drama series that BoJack plays the lead in, but becomes nervous when the executives compare it to Horsin' Around. He and Cuddlywhiskers give it a nonsense rewrite while high, rename it The BoJack Horseman Show, and premiere it, but it is poorly received and quickly forgotten about.
28	3	"BoJack Kills"	Amy Winfrey	Kelly Galuska	July 22, 2016	303
Jill asks BoJack to retrieve a love letter from Cuddlywhiskers's house, but he and Diane find an orca stripper dead in his pool. The use of BoJack's name in her last text lead him and Diane to believe he is being framed for murder, but they learn that "BoJack" is actually the name of a brand of heroin being distributed by a former Horsin' Around actor, which the stripper overdosed on. Todd and Mr. Peanutbutter get sprayed by a skunk and end up setting fire to Mr. Peanutbutter's yard while trying to fix it. BoJack and Diane find Cuddlywhiskers in a hut up in Ojai, where he explains that he gave up his material desires after he felt nothing when he won an Oscar and dedicated himself to helping addicts. He advises them to give up everything if they want to be happy, advice which makes them both uncomfortable. Guest starring: Fred Savage as Goober
29	4	"Fish Out of Water"	Mike Hollingsworth	Elijah Aron & Jordan Young	July 22, 2016	304
BoJack attends a film festival in the Pacific Ocean, where he cannot understand the native tongue and is forced to wear a helmet that prevents him from speaking. He spots Kelsey Jannings there for her new film and writes a halfhearted apology note for getting her fired, but is swept onto a bus by a school of minnows and taken out of the city before he can deliver it. On the bus, BoJack watches a seahorse give birth and accidentally leave one of his babies behind. BoJack forms a kinship with the infant and tries to return it to its father, a series of hijinks leading them through the deep sea and a taffy factory. He eventually gets it home and turns down the father's offer of money, but is saddened when he realizes he cannot tell which of the children is the one he rescued. He returns to the city to find that Secretariat is a big success. After seeing Kelsey leaving, he writes a heartfelt note about connection and gives it to her, but is horrified to see the ink has dissolved in the water as she leaves in annoyance. A human tells BoJack to get out of the way by pressing a button on his helmet, causing BoJack to realize he could have spoken the whole time while he was underwater. Winner of "Special Distinction for a TV Series" at the Annecy International Animated Film Festival.
30	5	"Love and/or Marriage"	J.C. Gonzalez	Peter A. Knight	July 22, 2016	305
Secretariat premieres publicly and is met with overwhelmingly positive reviews. BoJack and Todd celebrate at a hotel, where they bump into Emily, who is there for her best friend's rehearsal dinner. Sensing Emily's attraction to Todd, BoJack sets them up with a room so they can have sex, but Todd is again uncomfortable and leaves Emily alone. BoJack accidentally causes one of the brides to have doubts about her marriage, and he reinvigorates her by talking about his own feelings on love, which depresses him and leads him to have sex with a dejected Emily. Princess Carolyn goes on three dates; she finds the first two unsatisfying, but enjoys her third one with mouse Ralph Stilton. Diane does LSD with a client when he accidentally calls her to hang out with him. Returning home while high, Diane tells Mr. Peanutbutter that she loves him despite his eccentricities, and injures her wrist when she tries to carry him. At the hospital, Diane learns that she is pregnant. Guest Starring: Dave Franco as Alexi Brosefino
31	6	"Brrap Brrap Pew Pew"	Amy Winfrey	Joanna Calo	July 22, 2016	306
Diane and Mr. Peanutbutter agree to get an abortion, and she accidentally tweets that she is getting one from pop star Sextina Aquafina's account while talking to BoJack. Princess Carolyn and Sextina embrace it when it gains her popularity and plan to fake an abortion on live television, which Diane is disgusted with until she realizes the music is inspiring young women getting their own abortions. Sextina actually gets pregnant and plans to keep it, and Diane and Princess Carolyn start plotting about how to handle it. BoJack fires Ana when he realizes she is working with all the other actors in talks for Oscar nominations. This arouses Ana, causing her to drop all her other clients and begin a sexual relationship with him. Guest starring: Daniele Gaither as Sextina Aquafina
32	7	"Stop the Presses"	Adam Parton	Joe Lawson	July 22, 2016	307
BoJack calls a newspaper that keeps delivering to his door despite trying to get it cancelled, and recounts recent events to the representative as she tries to convince him to keep his subscription. Margo Martindale is revealed to have been hiding in the Escape From L.A. and stealing food from his kitchen, and eventually takes the boat to flee from the law. Emily and Todd start a female cab service with women drivers, but BoJack and Emily are visibly uncomfortable around each other, and she eventually leaves without explaining the problem to Todd. While looking at Secretariat ads, BoJack is captivated by a reflective one that reads "YOU ARE SECRETARIAT", but Ana is unable to get the producers to approve it. Curious about her private life, BoJack follows her and finds that she is as lonely as he is, which makes him uncomfortable. The representative advises him to be direct with Ana, and he finishes the call without cancelling the newspaper. He goes to her and firmly asks for the advertisement to be run, which results in a mirror billboard being put up on a highway that only reflects the sky, thus making the ad a flop. Guest starring: Candice Bergen as The Closer
33	8	"Old Acquaintance"	J.C. Gonzalez	Alison Flierl & Scott Chernoff	July 22, 2016	308
Diane and Mr. Peanutbutter go to the Labrador Peninsula to be with his family for the New Year's. Diane believes Mr. Peanutbutter's older brother is expressing distaste for her abortion when he makes several morbid statements about mortality around her. He instead reveals to Mr. Peanutbutter that he actually has a twisted spleen that requires surgery to fix, which worries him. BoJack is contacted by the actor who played his son on Horsin' Around, Bradley Hitler-Smith, who wants to do a sequel series about his character. BoJack is too nervous to directly turn him down, so Ana rudely does it for him. Rutabaga Rabitowitz and Vanessa Gekko, having started their own agency together, compete with Princess Carolyn to land their horse actors in a new David Pincher movie. Princess Carolyn initially gains the upper hand through her past assistant, but they use Kelsey and the fact that Princess Carolyn held her assistant back to win the role, putting Princess Carolyn's agency in jeopardy. BoJack loses his chance to reconnect with Kelsey when Princess Carolyn tries to price him higher than Kelsey can afford. Guest starring: "Weird Al" Yankovic as Captain Peanutbutter
34	9	"Best Thing That Ever Happened"	Amy Winfrey	Kate Purdy	July 22, 2016	309
BoJack has dinner with Princess Carolyn at the restaurant he owns, where he fires her for her inability to handle Bradley and Kelsey. The head waiter mistakes this for him being fired and gets almost the entire staff to quit, and BoJack and Princess Carolyn fight over the history of their relationship. As BoJack and the only remaining staff member try to figure out how to cook for a food critic, Princess Carolyn briefly leaves, but cannot resist coming back to save him. They order the food critic to leave when she reveals herself to be a Tumblr blogger, and BoJack admits that he loves Princess Carolyn but refuses to rehire her.
35	10	"It's You"	Adam Parton	Vera Santamaria	July 22, 2016	310
Mr. Peanutbutter is given the opportunity to host the Oscar nomination announcements, but loses the envelope containing the nominees after he gets distracted when he learns that his brother is recovering well from surgery. He and Todd try to come up with a new list of nominees from scratch, and while Mr. Peanutbutter picks BoJack for a Best Actor slot, Todd is reluctant. Princess Carolyn's competent assistant Judah Mannowdog suggests that she use the agency's financial struggles as an excuse to temporarily shut it down and live her life; she asks Ralph out on a second date, to which he agrees. BoJack throws a party at his house to celebrate his nomination despite Diane warning him that it will not make him happy, and he drives his new Tesla through his window and into his pool when he realizes Ana does not actually care about him beyond his Oscar campaign. Mr. Peanutbutter saves him from drowning and explains that he was not actually nominated like they had assumed. BoJack confronts Todd on not wanting him to win, admitting that he slept with Emily in the process. Enraged, Todd tells BoJack that he cannot keep blaming other things for his faults, telling him that, ultimately, "it's you."
36	11	"That's Too Much, Man!"	J.C. Gonzalez	Elijah Aron & Jordan Young	July 22, 2016	311
BoJack convinces Sarah Lynn to break her sobriety and go on a bender with him. They binge Horsin' Around and goes to one of her sobriety meetings, where he rambles about his misdeed with Penny before blacking out. Through a series of blackouts, he tries to make amends with all of the people in his life, including Ana, who tells him a story where the moral is that some people cannot be saved. He and Sarah Lynn drive to Oberlin to see if Penny Carson is alright, but his appearance only distresses her after she seemed fine prior to their visit. BoJack and Sarah Lynn snort BoJack brand heroin and watch her win an Oscar in a dingy motel room; Sarah Lynn admits that it does not make her happy and she hates her famous life. They go to the planetarium at her request, where BoJack promises her that things will be fine. She falls asleep in his arms and remains unresponsive when he tries to wake her. Guest Starring: Wiz Khalifa as himself
37	12	"That Went Well"	Amy Winfrey	Raphael Bob-Waksberg	July 22, 2016	312
In 2007, BoJack approaches Sarah Lynn after a show, and she vents to him before he uncaringly asks her to guest star on The BoJack Horseman Show, visibly wounding her. In the present, Sarah Lynn dies of an overdose, leaving BoJack guilt-stricken, and he decides to do Bradley's show. Princess Carolyn decides to open the agency back up but work as a manager instead of an agent. Diane gets a job at a company run by Ralph's sister, who hires her because she is impressed by her speaking out against Hank Hippopopalous. (Note: As depicted in "Hank After Dark".) Martindale crashes the Escape From L.A. into a boat full of spaghetti, and Mr. Peanutbutter, whose house is full of strainers from a failed business venture, utilizes Todd's cab company to save the day, giving him plentiful job opportunities. He is approached by his first wife Katrina, who wants to use his new popularity to have him run for governor. Todd dissolves the company and becomes a millionaire. He takes Emily out to lunch, accidentally tipping the waitress his new fortune in the process, and admits he may be asexual despite not knowing the term. BoJack gets on well with the cast of the new show, but panics and flees when a child actress says she wants to be like him. A teenage horse girl calls Princess Carolyn looking for BoJack, who speeds his Tesla down a desert highway and lets go of the wheel for a moment, with the intention of committing suicide. He suddenly sees a pack of wild horses jogging and watches them in awe.

== Production ==
Less than two weeks following the airing of the second season, BoJack Horseman was renewed for a third season of twelve episodes.

== Reception ==
On the review aggregator Rotten Tomatoes, the season holds an approval rating of 100% based on 31 reviews, with an average rating of 9.1/10. The site's critical consensus reads, "Skillfully puncturing the idea of celebrity and our culture's bizarre obsession with it, BoJack Horseman's third season continues its streak as one of the funniest and most heartbreaking shows on television." On Metacritic, the season received a score of 89 out of 100, based on 12 reviews, indicating "universal acclaim".

Daniel Fienberg of The Hollywood Reporter praised the season, saying: "The title 'Best Show on TV' is one that I like to bestow actively based on which series are and aren't currently on-air—and as of the Friday's premiere of 12 new episodes, it's possible that BoJack Horseman will hold the title, at least for a little while." Sonia Saraiya of Variety also praised the season, but admitted that this third season wasn't as strong as the second, saying "The third season isn't quite what the second season was. In some ways, that's a shame: The second season had a tight arc that both deployed some fantastic storytelling and demonstrated the show's myriad abilities. The third season isn't nearly so neatly constructed; the end of the season feels less like a conclusion and more like a plateau. But without the smooth lines of deliberate plotting, the show is able to find some really brilliant sweet spots." Liz Shannon Miller of Indiewire gave the season an "A", saying: "Many Season 3 episodes are definable in simple terms ... they actually function as stand-alone on a level that you honestly don't see too often ... this leads to some jaw-dropping installments, which iris in on character on levels that range from hilarious to heartbreaking."

The fourth episode, "Fish Out of Water," received critical acclaim and has largely been considered the highlight of the season. Bojack's production designer Lisa Hanawalt talked about the episode in an interview with Vox, stating: "I'm so delighted with what we were able to do ... everyone [on the show] knew it was our Fantasia. Daniel D'Addario of Time magazine called "Fish Out of Water" the best television episode of 2016, stating, "This episode is dazzingly beautiful and among the most creative single episodes of TV in memory; it's also a perceptive and painful look at being forced to confront one's regrets." Jesse David Fox of Vulture also called this episode one of the best of 2016, saying the episode "plays out as if the iconic Looney Tunes director Chuck Jones were tasked with doing a Charlie Chaplin–inspired Fantasia segment ... tonally and formally inventive, silly and bittersweet, visually and sonically beautiful: It's a much-watch, and the best part is, you don't have to have watched a single other episode of the series to love it." Les Chappell of The A.V. Club gave the episode an "A", stating: "This episode is nothing short of a masterpiece, a culmination of both BoJack Horseman's unique animation style and its views on isolation and connection. Taken as part of the whole it could very well be the best episode that the show has ever done, and taken on its own it's a hauntingly beautiful story of being a stranger in a strange land. It finds the lowest possible geographic point to take its main character, and from that place it ascends to the highest point the series has ever reached."

This season's look at depression was also praised. Show creator Raphael Bob-Waksberg, in an interview with HuffPost, explained that for the series, "It was never our top priority to be the voice of depression ... [Bojack Horseman is not] trying to capture this thing [depression] as much as it is trying to capture this character and what he is." Regardless, Maxwell Strachan of HuffPost considers this season, and the show as a whole, to be one of the very few shows that accurately depicts the mental illness, saying "Outside of a handful of series, depictions of depression in Hollywood have historically felt one-dimensional, as if writers Googled 'depression' and decided it meant 'sad.' In BoJack, we finally have a fully formed character that deals with depression in all its forms, too. We see BoJack suffocating as he grapples with the idea that he will never reach his own definition of greatness, that it is too late to turn his life around, that his best days are behind him and his worst ones ahead. It's not pretty, but it can be soothing to see someone who relates, even if that someone is a drunk horse with a temper." Strachan further explains: "For a brief moment, it feels as if BoJack has finally had a revelation that could last―that he will stop his self-destructive ways, learn to prioritize the people he cares about and beat his depression forever. But soon enough, BoJack is back in the pit of despair, hating himself and hurting the people around him. It's a sad, familiar cycle. It's also what makes the show so good. 'BoJack Horseman' doesn't excuse bad behavior. But it certainly can help those who are struggling with the depression that can cause that bad behavior to feel less alone."
