= Alexis Wilkinson =

American writer and comedian (born 1992)

- Born: 1992 (age 33–34)
- Education: Harvard University (BA)
- Occupation: Writer
- Years active: 2014–present
- Website: http://www.ohgoditsalexis.com

Alexis Wilkinson (born 1992) is an American writer and comedian. She gained prominence after she was elected the first African American president of The Harvard Lampoon.

Wilkinson was a staff writer for Veep and Brooklyn Nine-Nine, and she is a contributing writer to The New Yorker.

== Early life and education ==
Wilkinson was raised in Wheaton, Illinois and Milwaukee, Wisconsin, where she graduated from Nicolet High School. Growing up, Wilkinson wrote for herself and in high school wrote a satirical newsletter with her friends, but she didn’t take being a writer too seriously.

She attended Harvard University and studied economics, with aspirations of writing for television. Wilkinson joined The Harvard Lampoon writing staff as a freshman, and her junior year she was elected president of the publication, the first African American student of any gender to hold the position.

== Career ==
Just prior to graduating, Wilkinson sent copies of The Harvard Lampoon to the Harvard alumni trustees and asked for job leads. David Mandel was a recipient and the show runner of Veep; he hired Wilkinson onto the writing staff. She was the only person of color in the writer's room. Wilkinson left Veep to join the writing staff of Brooklyn Nine-Nine in 2016.

She left TV writing to work on her first book. She also consults on ad campaigns.

Alexis Wilkinson has written for publications such as Time, Vulture, the New Yorker, Harper's Bazaar, and Elle.

In November 2019, it was announced that Wilkinson had written an audiobook for Serial Box, called The Co-Founder, about two female entrepreneurs who hire a man to sell their product to Silicon Valley investors. It is also currently being developed into a film.

== Personal life ==
Wilkinson has resided in San Francisco, California. While her whereabouts are currently unknown, she has been sighted in the Midwest.

== Awards and nominations ==
- 2017 – Writers Guild of America Award, Veep - Nominee
- 2017 – Writers Guild of America Award for Comedy/Variety Special, 68th Primetime Emmy Awards - Nominee
- 2018 – Writers Guild of America Award, Veep - Winner
