= The Light Bulb Scene =

- BoJack Horseman episode
- Episode no.: Season 5 Episode 1
- Directed by: Adam Parton
- Written by: Kate Purdy
- Original release date: September 14, 2018
- Running time: 26 minutes

Guest appearances
- Whoopi Goldberg as Mikaela; Natalie Morales as Yolanda Buenaventura

Episode chronology
← Previous "What Time Is It Right Now"	Next → "The Dog Days Are Over"
- BoJack Horseman season 5

"The Light Bulb Scene" is the fifth season premiere of American animated television series BoJack Horseman, and the 49th episode overall. It was written by Kate Purdy and directed by Adam Parton, and was released in the United States, along with the rest of season five, via Netflix on September 14, 2018. The episode was praised by critics, particularly the character development of the lead character.

== Plot ==
Well into the production of his new detective show and return to television, Philbert, BoJack Horseman is having casual sex with his costar Gina Cazador and finds himself confused and aggravated by Flip McVicker, creator of Philbert. When he criticizes a scene where Philbert goes to a strip club, Flip changes it to him drawing Gina's character naked. He again asks for it to be changed, and so Flip writes a new scene where Philbert screws in a light bulb while naked. BoJack, not wanting to film any more nude scenes, tries to get Todd Chavez to infiltrate WhatTimeIsItRightNow.com and send Flip an email prohibiting any further nude scenes; Todd obliges after his girlfriend, Yolanda Buenaventura, asks him to get a job, but he ends up becoming president of the website's ad sales and is unable to help BoJack. BoJack also admits to Princess Carolyn that he feels uncomfortable doing the show because Philbert is a character that reflects the worst parts of him, but both she and Flip promise that he and the character are separate people, and he does the scene. Mr. Peanutbutter picks Diane Nguyen up from the airport and hands over his completed divorce papers.

== Production ==
"The Light Bulb Scene" was written by Kate Purdy and directed by Adam Parton. The song "Los Ageless" by artist St. Vincent is featured in this episode, both in the opening scene and over the closing credits.

== Release ==
"The Light Bulb Scene" was released in the United States, along with the rest of season five, on Netflix on September 14, 2018. An anonymous writer for Vulture praised BoJack Horseman's character development, saying that "it's amazing to see BoJack come at his life in a way that doesn't feel like a cheap bargain plan or workaround." Writing for The A.V. Club, Les Chappell praised the episode as a good follow up to the season 4 finale, "What Time Is It Right Now".
