= NAACP Image Award for Outstanding Character Voice-Over Performance – Television or Film =

American voice acting award, 2016 to 2020

The NAACP Image Award for Outstanding Character Voice-Over Performance– Television or Film arose as a category in 2016, and was awarded until 2021, when the award was split to honor film and television performances separately. Prior to this category, voice-over performances in animated works were typically nominated and honored in the Outstanding Youth Performance category.

== Winners and nominees ==
Year	Actor / Actress	Series/Film	Ref
2016	Loretta Devine	Doc McStuffins	
2016	Aisha Tyler	Archer	
2016	Audra McDonald	Doc McStuffins	
2016	Jeffrey Wright	The Good Dinosaur	
2016	Wanda Sykes	Penn Zero	
2017	Idris Elba	The Jungle Book	
2017	Loretta Devine	Doc McStuffins	
2017	Idris Elba	Finding Dory	
2017	Kevin Hart	The Secret Life of Pets	
2017	Dwayne Johnson	Moana	
2018	Tiffany Haddish	Legends of Chamberlain Heights	
2018	Yvette Nicole Brown	Elena of Avalor	
2018	Loretta Devine	Doc McStuffins	
2018	David Oyelowo	The Lion Guard	
2018	Kerry Washington	Cars 3	
2019	Samuel L. Jackson	Incredibles 2	
2019	Issa Rae	Bojack Horseman	
2019	Laya Deleon Hayes	Doc McStuffins	
2019	Mahershala Ali	Spider-Man: Into the Spider-Verse	
2019	Shameik Moore	Spider-Man: Into the Spider-Verse	
2020	James Earl Jones	The Lion King	
2020	Alfre Woodard	The Lion King	
2020	Donald Glover	The Lion King	
2020	Lupita Nyong'o	Serengeti	
2020	Sterling K. Brown	Frozen II	

== Multiple nominations ==
Loretta Devine received the most nominations in this category for her voice work in Doc McStuffins.
