= Stop the Presses (BoJack Horseman) =

- BoJack Horseman episode
- Episode no.: Season 3 Episode 7
- Directed by: Adam Parton
- Written by: Joe Lawson
- Original release date: July 22, 2016
- Running time: 26 minutes

Guest appearances
- Angela Bassett as Ana Spanikopita; Candice Bergen as The Closer; Abbi Jacobson as Emily; Margo Martindale as Character Actress Margo Martindale; J. K. Simmons as Lenny Turteltaub; Anna Deavere Smith as Betty Bruce

Episode chronology
← Previous "Brrap Brrap Pew Pew"	Next → "Old Acquaintance"
- BoJack Horseman season 3

"Stop the Presses" is the seventh episode of the third season of the American animated television series BoJack Horseman, and the 31st episode overall. It was written by Joe Lawson and directed by Adam Parton. The episode was released in the United States, along with the rest of season three, via Netflix on July 22, 2016. Angela Bassett, Candice Bergen, Abbi Jacobson, Margo Martindale, J. K. Simmons, and Anna Deavere Smith provided voices in guest appearances in the episode.

In February 2017, "Stop the Presses" won the Writers Guild of America Award for Television: Animation at the 69th WGA Awards.

== Plot ==
When BoJack attempts to cancel a newspaper subscription, he instead receives sage advice from the newspaper representative. Todd and Emily begin a ride-sharing business with only female drivers, and Emily attempts to hide from Todd the fact that she slept with BoJack.

== Reception ==
"Stop the Presses" received generally positive reviews from critics. Les Chappell of AV Club, who gave the episode an "A−", praised the show for its ability to "craft episodes that ... are easily identifiable as 'the XX episode'" with "Stop the Presses" being labeled "the first episode of BoJack to become unstuck in time". Jenny Jaffe of Vulture gave the episode four out of five stars, writing that the episode "has a few worrisome moments, but over and over, it pulls itself back from the edge".
