= Joe Lawson (writer) =

American television writer

- Born: Bristol, Tennessee, U.S.
- Education: Tennessee High School; Wake Forest University
- Occupation: Television writer

Joe Lawson is an American television writer. He is the creator and writer of the GEICO Cavemen commercials, which he created while working at The Martin Agency. He was co-executive producer and writer for ABC's short-lived Cavemen, which aired from October 2, 2007 to November 13, 2007. He was also a writer and producer for the ABC comedy Modern Family, which first aired on September 23, 2009.

In 2017, he won the Writers Guild of America Award for Television: Animation for writing the BoJack Horseman episode "Stop the Presses".

== Early life ==
Lawson was born in Bristol, Tennessee. He attended Tennessee High School and then Wake Forest University.

== Modern Family ==
Lawson wrote the following episodes of Modern Family:

- "Great Expectations"
- "Truth Be Told"
- "Game Changer"

== BoJack Horseman ==
Lawson wrote the following episodes of BoJack Horseman:

- "Say Anything"
- "After the Party"
- "Escape From L.A."
- "Start Spreading the News"
- "Stop the Presses" (won the 69th Writers Guild of America Awards)
- "The Amelia Earhart Story"
- "Intermediate Scene Study w/ BoJack Horseman"
