= Interspecies family =

The term "interspecies family" refers to a group consisting of at least two members of different species who deeply care for each other. Examples include a human and their dog, a couple and their cats, a dog and a cat, or even a mule and a sheep. The emphasis is on love and that the members of the group care for, and treat each other like a family. For instance, "interspecies family" may describe a group composed of a dog and a person who refers to their dog as their child, best friend, or other phrases that connote a stronger bond than just a "pet", a term which implies a sense of property and ownership.

Most often this is used to discuss non-human interspecies families, typically where a mother of one species will foster a youngling from a different species. With the more recent growth of the fields of anthrozoology and animal studies, this is being used more frequently to refer especially to bonds between human and non-human animals.

== History and use ==
In 1881, Scientific American published a correspondence noting a female dog apparently mothered one puppy, but appeared to adopt a kitten born nearby and supposedly proceeded to suckling both her puppy and the kitten. The kitten was reported to accept the dog as a foster mother.

=== Anthropomorphism ===
Some of the earliest instances of the interspecies family involve the use of anthropomorphism, such as in the children's book Stuart Little in which a mouse is a member of a human family. This is a fairly common idea that led to some of the first uses of "interspecies family" in media targeted towards children.

=== Non-human animal relationships ===
There is also a popular trend in books and internet sites that involves capturing photographs and stories of interspecies non-human animal families. These heartwarming cases promote the idea that animals can look past such differences. However, in these cases they are more often referred to as "interspecies adoptions", "interspecies pairings", and "interspecies friendships".

=== Human and non-human animal relationships ===
Just recently, the term has been used to describe non-fiction situations involving human and non-human animal relationships. In 2011 a dissertation was written by Avigdor Edminster entitled "'This Dog Means Life': Making Interspecies Relations at an Assistance Dog Agency" in which "Interspecies families" is used frequently. There have been other instances since then, but they have been strictly within academic works.

In the fall of 2013, The National Museum of Animals & Society created the exhibit entitled 'My Dog Is My Home: The Experience of Human-Animal Homelessness'. The exhibit explores the experience of being homeless with an animal, and specifically the needs that are unmet because homeless services fail to recognize the legitimacy of the human-animal bond and their status as an "interspecies family". The exhibit helped popularize the phrase "interspecies family" among its animal protection audience as well as among social service providers. Part of the museum's mission is to promote this idea of inter-species families and make the general public more aware of the strong bonds that can be shared between human and non-human animals.
