= Travels with Scout =

- Modern Family episode
- The Dunphy family with Grandpa Frank (Fred Willard) and Scout
- Episode no.: Season 1 Episode 21
- Directed by: Seth Gordon
- Written by: Paul Corrigan; Brad Walsh
- Production code: 1ARG14
- Original air date: April 28, 2010

Guest appearances
- Reid Ewing as Dylan; Christopher Shea as Ben; Fred Willard as Frank Dunphy

Episode chronology
← Previous "Benched"	Next → "Airport 2010"
- Modern Family season 1

"Travels with Scout" is the twenty-first episode of Modern Family and the twenty-first episode of the series overall. It originally aired on April 28, 2010 on ABC. The episode was written by Paul Corrigan & Brad Walsh and directed by Seth Gordon.

In the episode, Phil's father visits unexpected bringing a dog, named Scout, with him. Claire is angry with him because he is planning to leave the dog with them but when he finally leaves and takes Scout with him, Claire is upset because she has bonded with it. Jay takes Manny with him to the movies to watch a movie that an old friend of Mitchell is playing in, but he does not know that is a horror movie, leading Manny to be scared causing troubles at home. Cameron joins Dylan's band as a drummer, since the drummer has to move to Portland, Oregon.

The episode also makes references to 21 Jump Street. "Travels with Scout" was viewed by slightly more than 10 million viewers and was the highest-rated episode of the series for two weeks. It received positive reviews from critics.

== Plot ==
In the Dunphy family, while Phil (Ty Burrell) is at work, his father Frank (Fred Willard) comes to his house to visit with his RV and a dog named Scout without telling Claire (Julie Bowen) that the dog is for them. Claire as expected is angry at this as she expects the family not to help with the dog and she will do all the work. While taking the trash out Claire overhears Frank crying in his RV. Claire tells Phil, but Phil doesn't believe this. Claire finally convinces Phil to ask his father what is wrong, though when he gets ready to ask, Phil instead avoids it with another question. Claire continues to be bothered by the dog, though it becomes clear she begins bonding with it. Finally, Phil asks Frank what is wrong and Frank tells Phil he fell in love, making Phil think his parents are divorcing. Then he says he fell in love with a he...Scout. Phil tells him he can take Scout home and Claire, who ends up being the most upset that Scout is leaving, gives Scout her bra. Frank then leaves with Luke (Nolan Gould) chasing the RV like a dog.

In the Delgado-Pritchett family plot, Jay (Ed O'Neill) meets Mitch's old acting friend Ben Dugan, who is starring in a new movie Maple Drive. Jay, not knowing it is a horror movie, takes Manny (Rico Rodriguez) to the movie, and Manny is completely frightened by it. While Jay is fixing the broken doorbell (which repeatedly rings), Manny thinks it is a demon and gets his fencing sword. Jay promises Gloria (Sofía Vergara) his fear will only last a while, although he realizes they have to do something when Manny begins sleeping in their bed. He asks Ben to come for a visit to show Manny how likable he is so he won't be scared anymore. When Ben arrives, he knocks on the window since the doorbell is broken. Manny sees him, and when Ben sees him he says "Are you Manny? I'm here for you." Due to the lighting on his face and his fake machete, Manny becomes especially frightened of him and rushes upstairs, much to Jay's disbelief.

In the Pritchett and Tucker family plot Cameron (Eric Stonestreet) comes to meet Scout and Frank. Dylan (Reid Ewing) has bad news that the drummer of his band is moving to Portland because his parents are getting back together. Cameron hears this and tells them he used to play drums before they got Lily. Cameron's audition is initially bad, but tells them he "was holding the sticks in the wrong hands" and when he put them in the other hand, he proves to be a very capable drummer. When Mitchell (Jesse Tyler Ferguson) finds out, he is annoyed since they are going to a party the same day and asks him to cancel the concert. Cameron says no since he always stays with Lily so Mitchell decides to go to the concert then the party. Mitchell ends up staying at the concert, admitting Cameron was amazing, although Cameron ends up showing off by playing a drum solo that is far too long. Afterwards, the old drummer returns since his parents separated again. Cameron thinks he is going to stay but realizes that he is the one that is going to leave.

== Production ==
The episode was written by Paul Corrigan and Brad Walsh and directed by Seth Gordon. The episode also features the second guest appearance of Fred Willard on Modern Family after "Undeck the Halls". Fred Willard previously worked with Christopher Lloyd, Steven Levitan (creators of Modern Family), and Ty Burrell on Back to You and had worked with Ed O'Neill on Married... with Children.

== Reception ==
=== Ratings ===
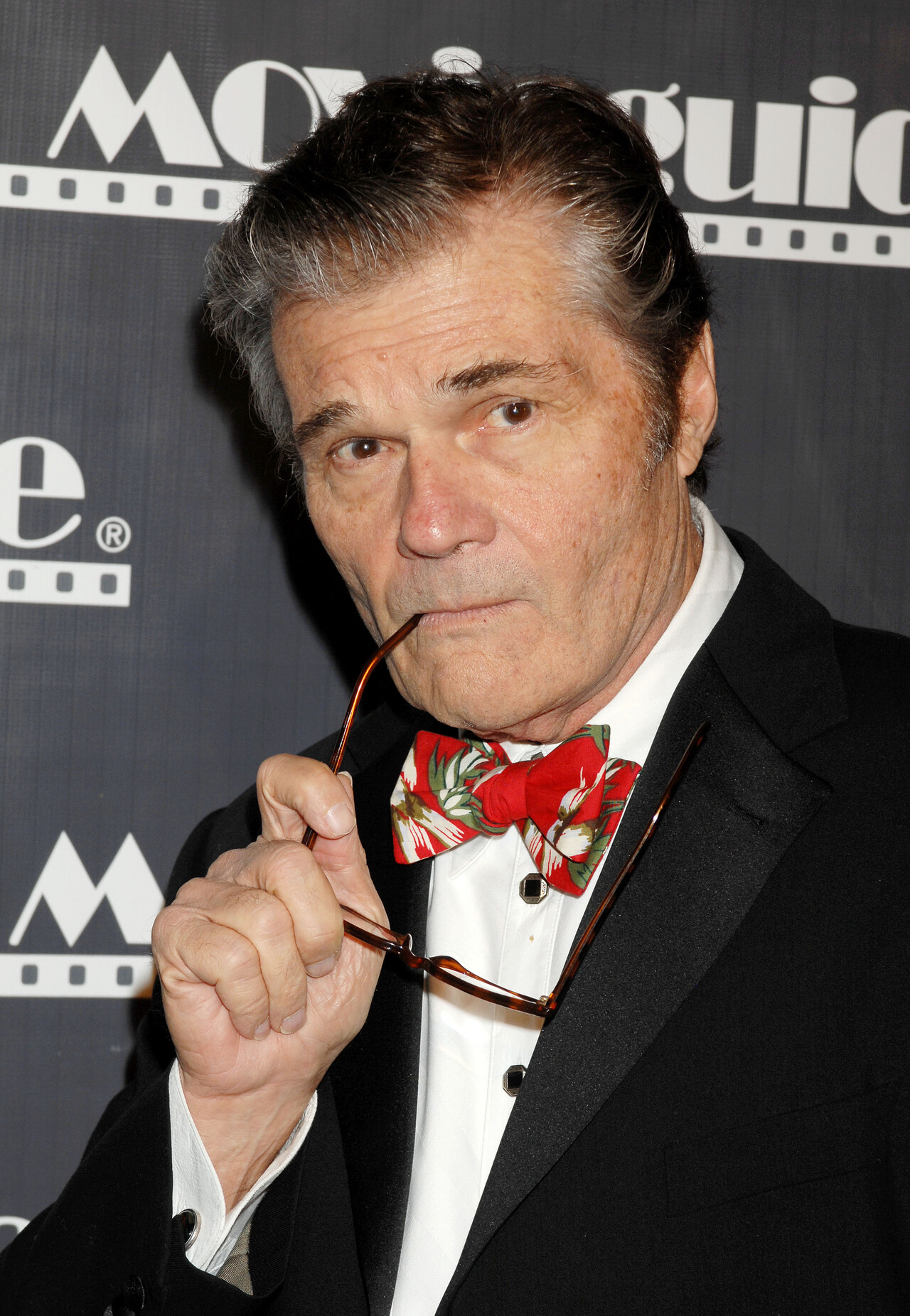
Fred Willard's performance received positive reviews from critics.

In its original American broadcast, "Travels with Scout" was viewed by 10.008 million viewers and received an 18–49 demographic of 4.2 and a share of 11% making it the second highest-rated episode of the series after "Hawaii" and tying with "Pilot", "Fifteen Percent" and "My Funky Valentine". The episode came second in its time slot after American Idol. The show ranked 6th in the 18–49 weekly ratings, becoming second highest-rated show on ABC after Dancing with the Stars and was the highest-rated scripted show on ABC as well. The show also ranked 19th in total viewers, making it the 10th most viewed show on ABC.

=== Reviews ===
Robert Canning of IGN gave the episode an 8.5, saying it was "Great" and "Overall, "Like any sitcom, the jokes get funnier the more you know about, and like, the characters. Our experiences with Luke made him running after his grandfather's RV like an excited puppy, with Phil yelling, "No, Luke, stay! Luke! Stay!" all the more funny. So the more we see of Frank, the better."

Margret Lyons of Entertainment Weekly gave the episode a lukewarm review as well writing "The thing about a just okay episode of Modern Family is that it’s still pretty damn good, so it’s hard to rag on. But I know how great this show is when it’s firing on all cylinders, and “Travels With Scout” just didn’t." although she praised Fred Willard and Ty Burrell's performance saying "Even though this won’t go down as one of Modern Family‘s best episodes, there’s no denying the fact that Fred Willard and Ty Burrell are the best cast father/son duo in living memory. Part of it is looks, but most of it is mannerisms and vocal cadences.

Donna Bowman of The A.V. Club gave the episode a B− saying "Let's be clear, this is a sloppy outing for Modern Family. It's an episode that feels plunked down out of order, not advancing any story lines in particular, and nothing in particular happening."

Jason Hughes of TV Squad said "I didn't fully grasp just how perfect Fred Willard is for the role of Phil's father until I saw them slinging jokes back and forth in this weeks' [sic] episode."

Alan Sepinwall of The Star-Ledger gave the episode a positive review, saying "very funny overall" although said that Fred Willard was too good for the role of Phil's dad.

=== Awards ===
As well as receiving positive reviews from critics Fred Willard was nominated for Primetime Emmy Award for Outstanding Guest Actor in a Comedy Series.
