= Benched (Modern Family) =

- Modern Family episode
- Eric Lange guests stars in this episode as the hot-tempered coach of Luke and Manny's basketball team
- Episode no.: Season 1 Episode 20
- Directed by: Chris Koch
- Written by: Danny Zuker
- Production code: 1ARG20
- Original air date: April 14, 2010

Guest appearances
- Justin Kirk as Charlie Bingham; Eric Lange as Coach Stupak

Episode chronology
← Previous "Game Changer"	Next → "Travels with Scout"
- Modern Family season 1

"Benched" is the twentieth episode of the first season of Modern Family and the twentieth episode of the series overall. It premiered on ABC on April 14, 2010. The episode was written by Danny Zuker and directed by Chris Koch.

In the episode Luke and Manny's hot-tempered basketball coach quits in the middle of the game after Jay and Phil argue with him, causing both to jockey for the position. Claire and Gloria each struggle with Alex and Manny’s adolescence, respectively and try to find a solution together. Mitchell takes Cameron along to meet a potential boss but they end up wrecking his Ferrari.

"Benched" has received positive reviews from critics and was viewed by 8.876 million viewers.

== Plot ==
Luke (Nolan Gould) and Manny's (Rico Rodriguez) hot-tempered basketball coach (Eric Lange) yells at the team all the time and makes cruel remarks. Jay (Ed O'Neill) and Phil (Ty Burrell) try to convince him to treat the kids better but he suddenly quits, leaving the team without a coach in the middle of the game. The coach's departure causes Jay and Phil to jockey for the position.

Claire (Julie Bowen) takes Alex (Ariel Winter) out shopping but their trip is cut off by an encounter with some of Alex's friends from school. Alex decides to go shopping with them instead and Claire feels like her daughter has finally turned into a teenager and does not want her around. Gloria (Sofía Vergara) faces the same problem with Manny when Manny pulls her off to the side and says that her words of affection embarrass him in front of his friends. The two women end up walking together while baby-sitting Lily talking about the problem they face with their kids and how to solve it.

Meanwhile, Mitchell (Jesse Tyler Ferguson) is still unemployed while Cameron (Eric Stonestreet) has a job with a greeting cards company, causing a role reversal in regards to Lily's parenting. Neither is suited to it, with Mitchell missing the workplace environment while Cameron misses spending time with Lily, although both claim to the other they are fine with the new arrangement. Mitchell takes Cam with him to meet a potential boss, who happens to be a golfing buddy with Jay. Mitchell gets offered the job but he says that he would need to talk it over with Cameron first, with both soon admitting they want things go back to the way they were. Mitchell decides to take the job, however he and Cameron accidentally lock themselves in the garage. Trying to get out, they end up wrecking Mitchell's new boss' Ferrari. Mitchell's new boss tells him he has to take the new job now.

== Production ==
The episode was written by Danny Zuker making it his third writing credit after "En Garde" and "Starry Night" and was directed by Chris Koch his second directing credit for the series after "Not in My House". "Benched" originally aired April 14, 2010 as the twentieth episode of the first season.

== Reception ==
=== Ratings ===
In its original American broadcast, "Benched" was viewed by 8.876 million viewers and a 3.6 rating/10% share dropping 8% from last week's episode. The show was the 6th most viewed show of the night and 3rd in its timeslot. The episode ranked 20 in the weekly viewership ranking sixth for ABC and ranked 8 in the 18-49 Nielsen Rating ranking 3rd on ABC in the rating.

=== Reviews ===
The episode received generally positive reviews.

Robert Canning of IGN gave the episode a 7.8 saying Eric Stonestreet (Cameron)'s performance was "great", even though the general reaction to the episode was lukewarm. Additionally, the episode "still provided a few big laughs and helped move some of the character development forward".

Margaret Lyons of Entertainment Weekly gave the episode a lukewarm review, saying only that "I loved the Cam/Mitchell story of who wants to work and who wants to stay home, [but] the cringe-factor of the party was a little too much for me".

Donna Bowman of The A.V. Club gave the episode a C+ saying the episode "stumbled". "Clumsy exposition, inconsistent timing, and a lost opportunity at a big setpiece" added up to the episode's performance as "middling at best".

Jason Hughes of The TV Squad called Claire's (Julie Bowen) dressing down of Alex "hilarious but brutal." Summing up the show's first season so far, Hughes stated "[a]fter this first season, I'd say the show is making a pretty strong case for itself" as one of the greatest comedies of all time.

James Poniewozik of Time said "After the travesty that was the iPad episode (which mercifully aired while I was on vacation), Modern Family was back with an episode that hit on pretty much every subplot, explored some new combinations of characters while offering fresh takes on old ones and proved the maxim: if you have a revolving driveway in the first act, it had better go off by the end of the third."

Matt Richenthal of TV Fanatic rated the episode with 4.8/5 stating that it was "one of the best episodes in Modern Family history combined humor and sweetness, while eliminating the sap."
