= Primetime Emmy Award for Outstanding Guest Actor in a Comedy Series =

American television award

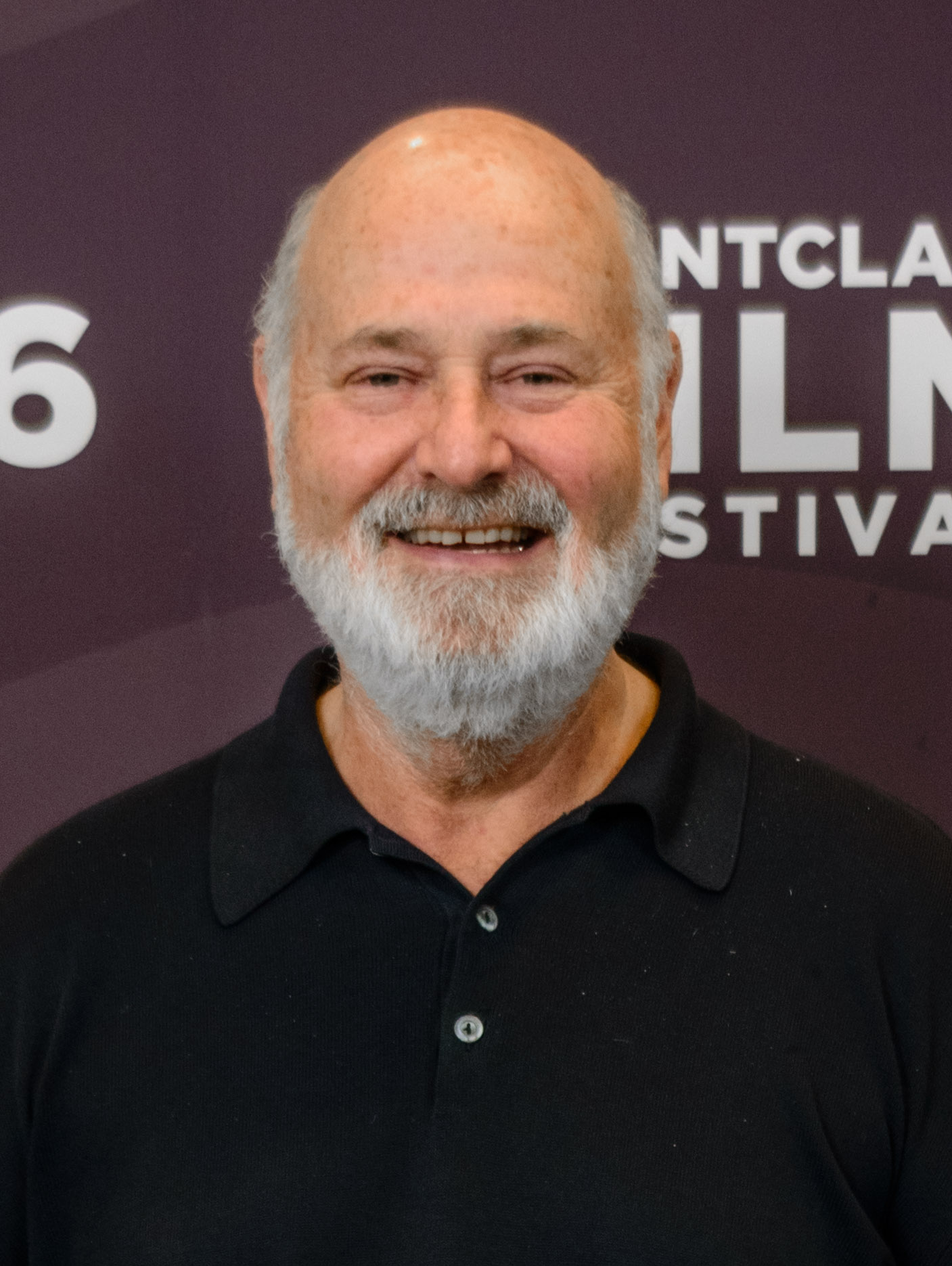
- The 2026 recipient: Rob Reiner
- Awarded for: Outstanding Guest Actor in a Comedy Series
- Country: United States
- Presented by: Academy of Television Arts & Sciences
- First award: 1986
- Currently held by: Rob Reiner, The Bear (2026)
- Website: emmys.com

This is a list of winners and nominees of the Primetime Emmy Award for Outstanding Guest Actor in a Comedy Series. Prior to 1988 the category was not gender specific, thus was called Outstanding Guest Performer in a Comedy Series. These awards, like the other "Guest" awards, are not presented at the Primetime Emmy Award ceremony, but rather at the Creative Arts Emmy Award ceremony. The current recipient is Rob Reiner who won posthumously for The Bear.

Beginning with the 77th Primetime Emmy Awards, performers are no longer eligible in guest acting categories if they were previously nominated for a lead or supporting award for playing the same character role in the same series.

Nathan Lane has received the most nominations in this category with 7, winning once for the Hulu comedy series Only Murders in the Building in 2022. Mel Brooks has received the most wins in this category for his role in the NBC comedy series Mad About You in 1997, 1998, and 1999.

== Winners and nominations ==
indicates the winner

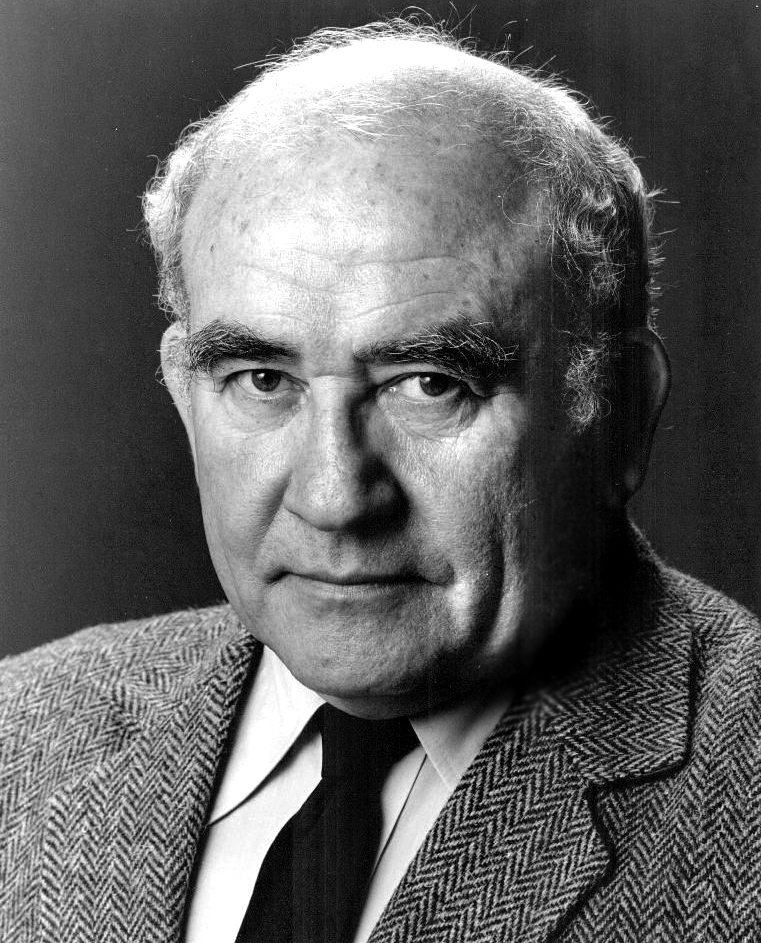
Ed Asner won twice consecutively for Rich Man, Poor Man (1976) and Roots (1977)

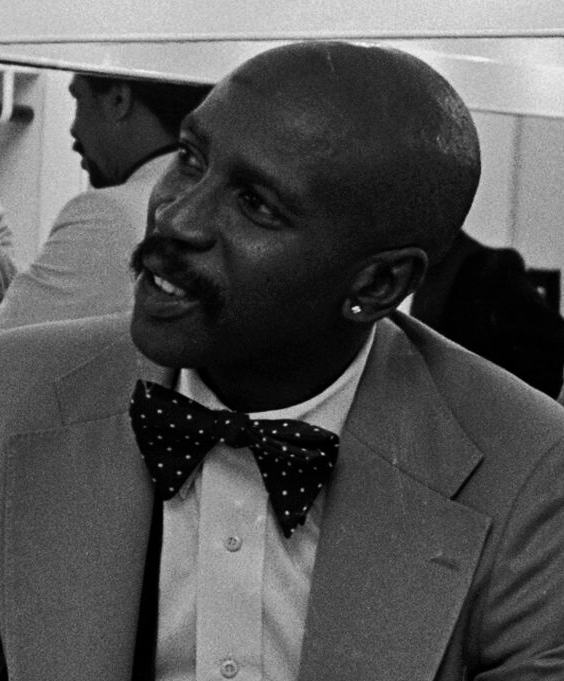
Louis Gossett Jr. won for Roots (1977)

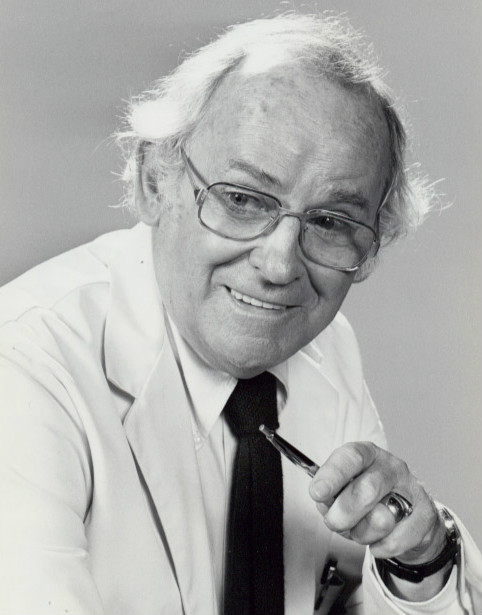
Barnard Hughes won for Lou Grant (1978)

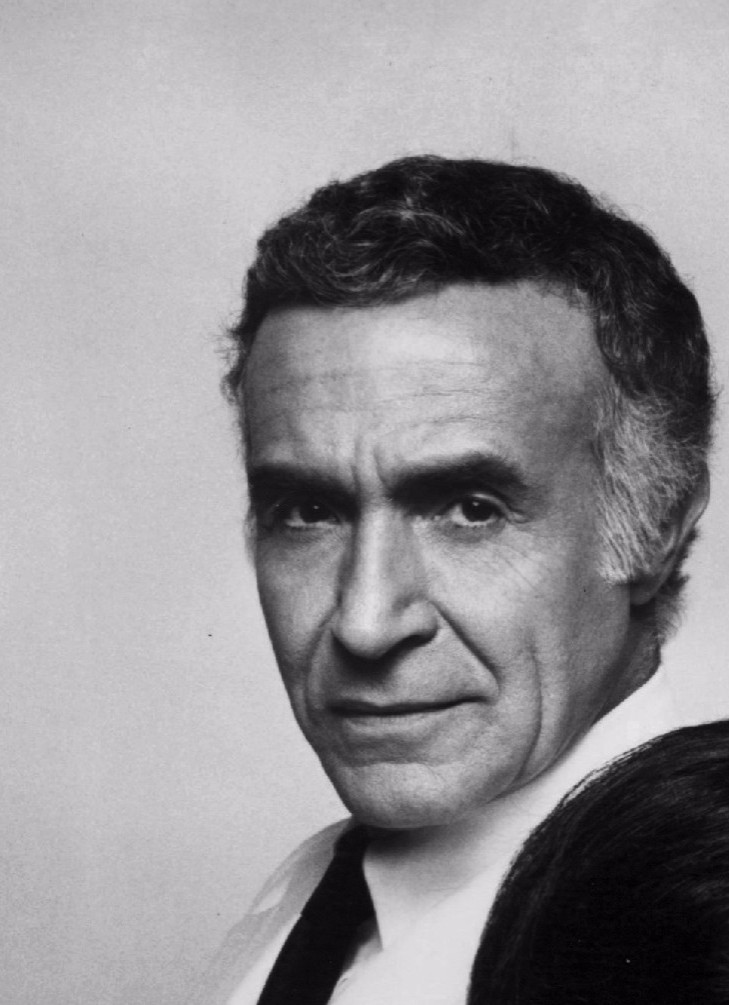
Ricardo Montalban for How the West Was Won (1978)

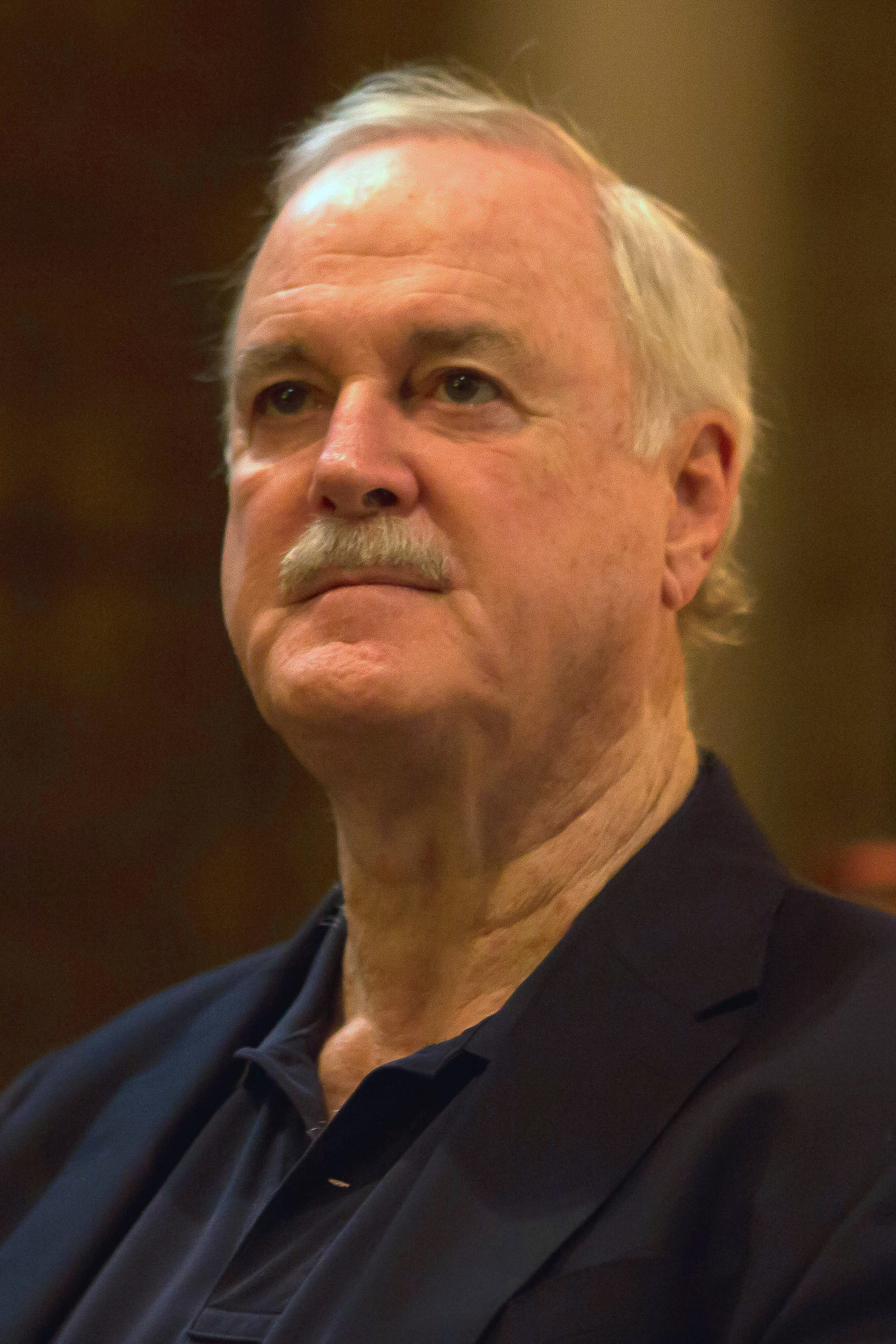
John Cleese won for Cheers (1987)

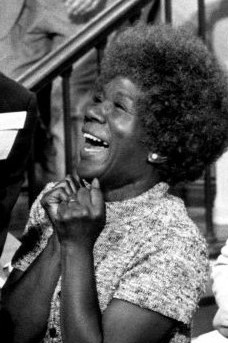
Beah Richards won for Frank's Place (1988)

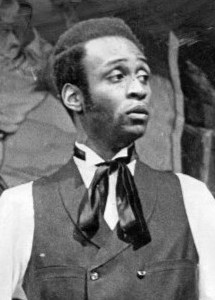
Cleavon Little won for Dear John (1989)

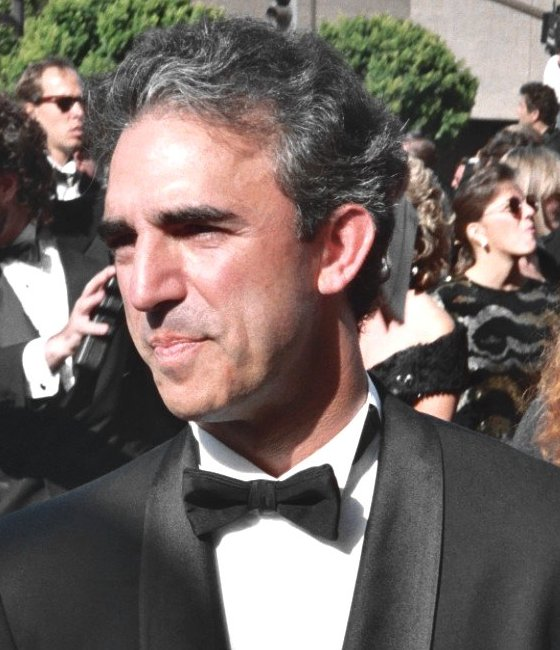
Jay Thomas won twice consecutively for Murphy Brown (1990, 1991)

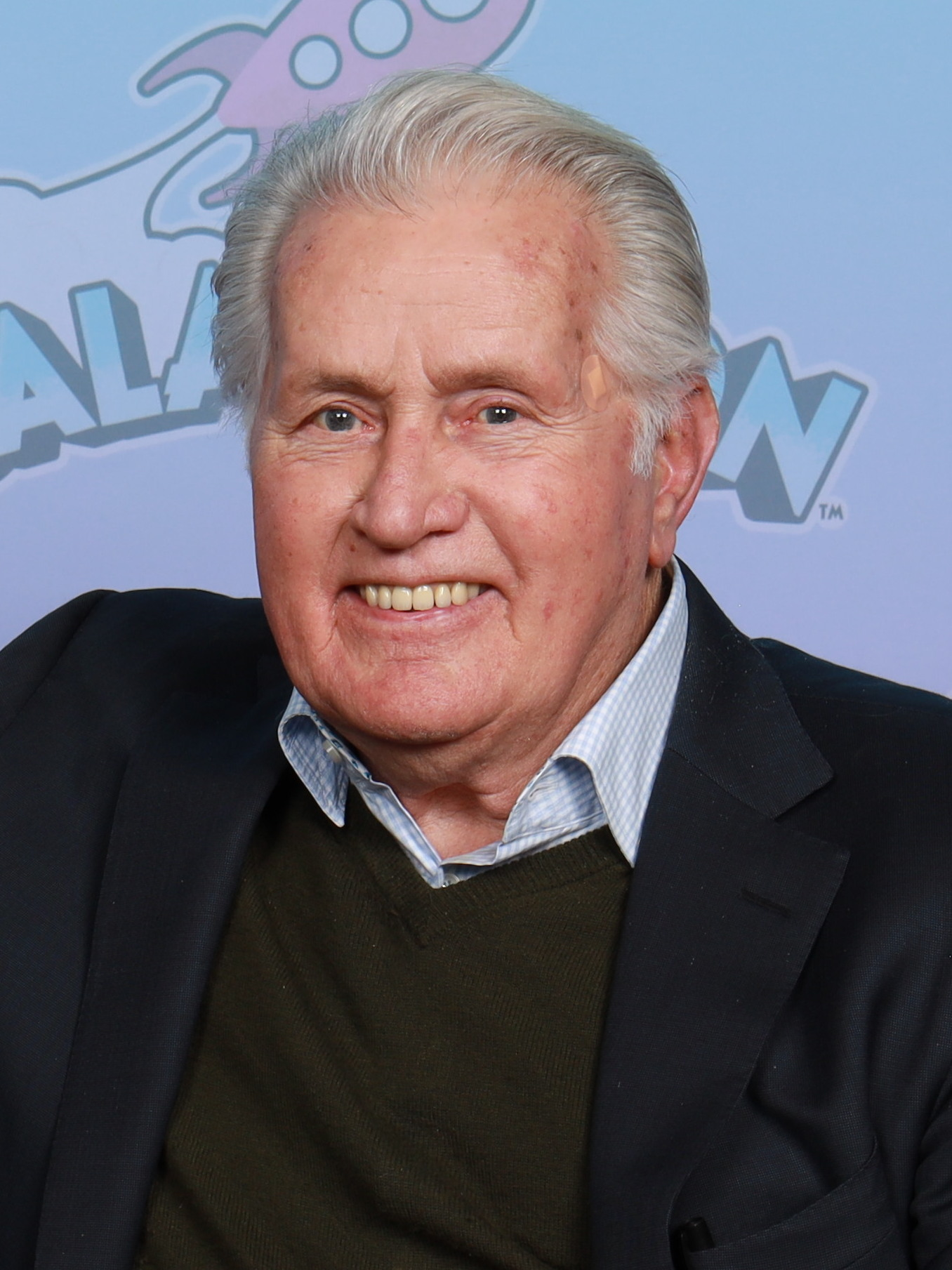
Martin Sheen won for Murphy Brown (1994).

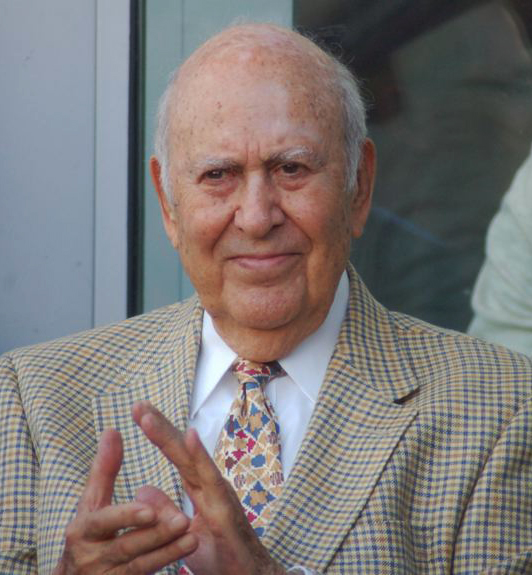
Carl Reiner won for Mad About You (1995).

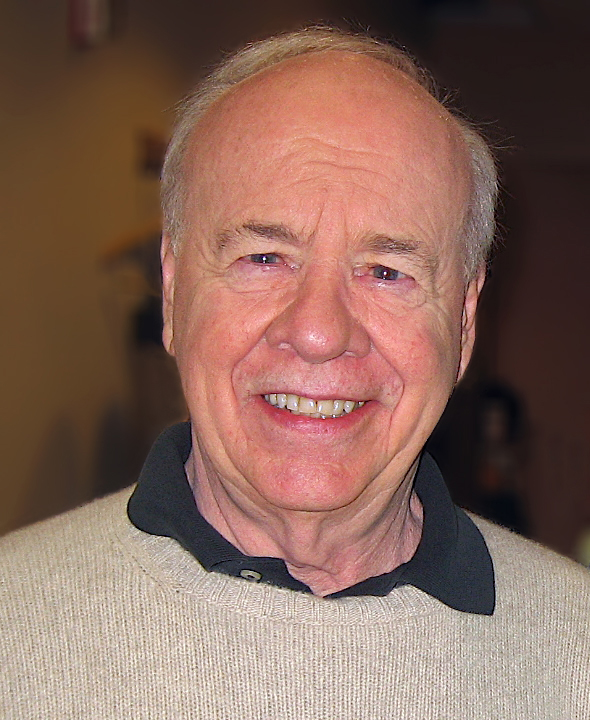
Tim Conway won twice for Coach (1996) and 30 Rock (2008).

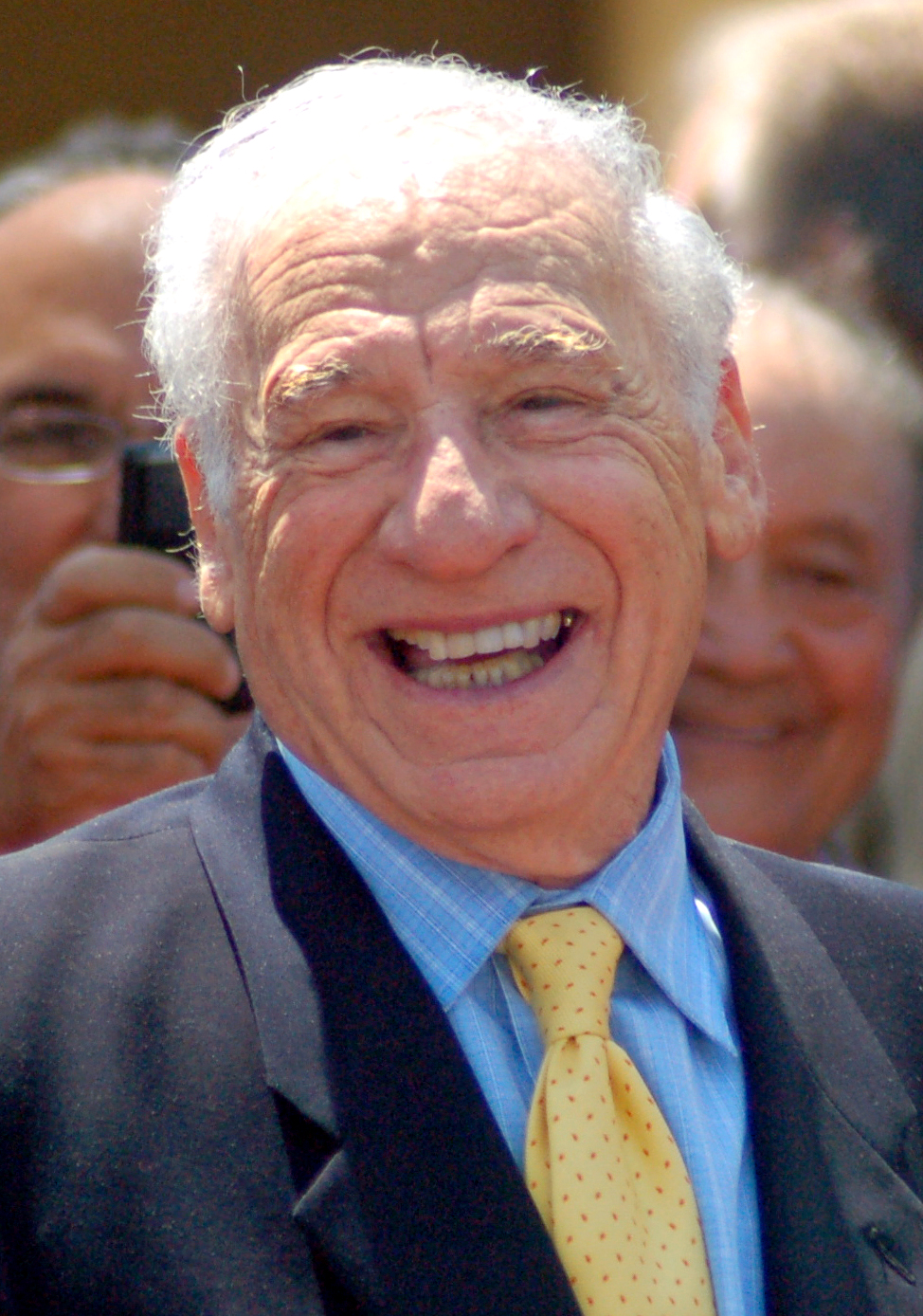
Mel Brooks won thrice consecutively for Mad About You in 1997, 1998, and 1999.

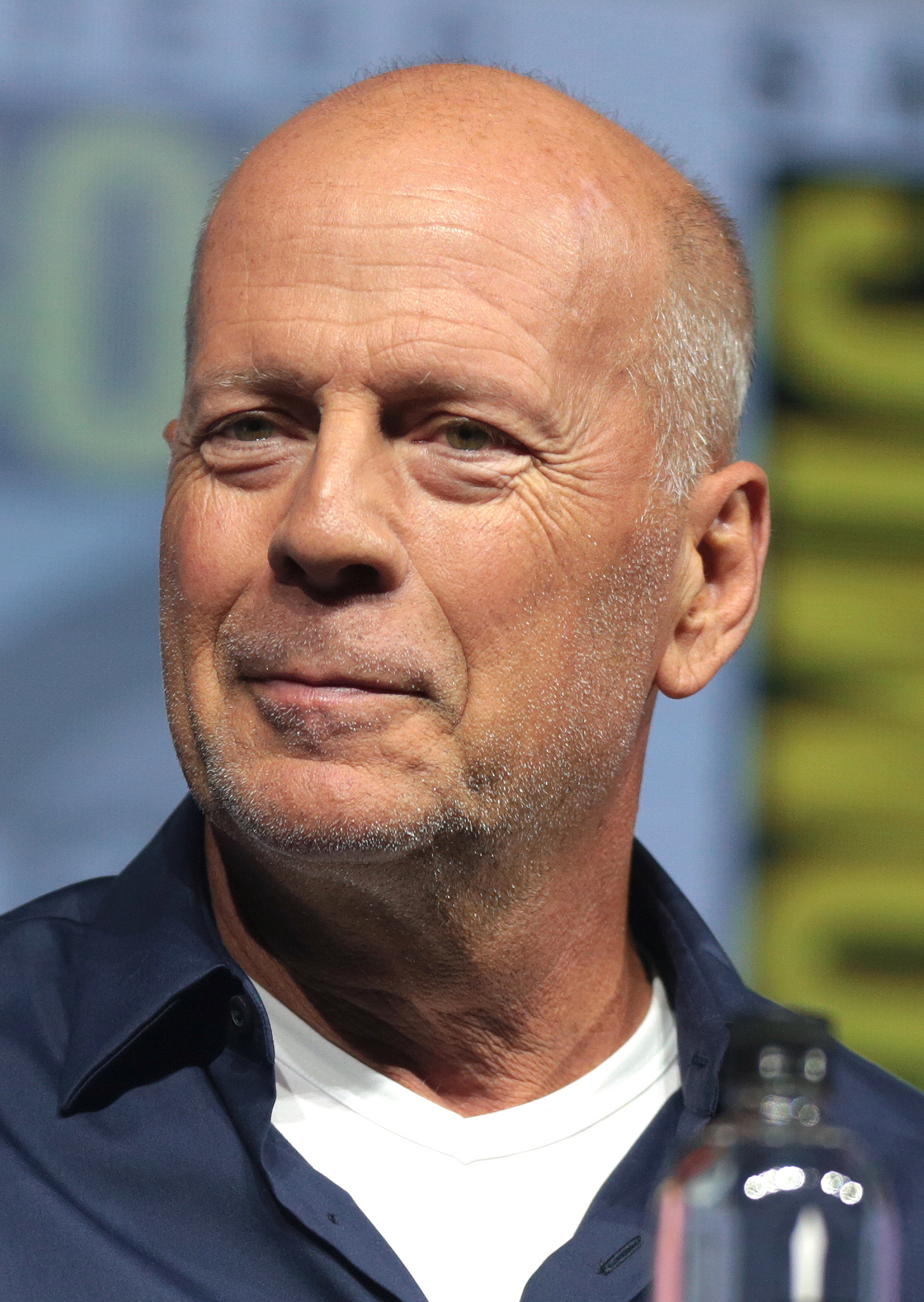
Bruce Willis won for Friends (2000).

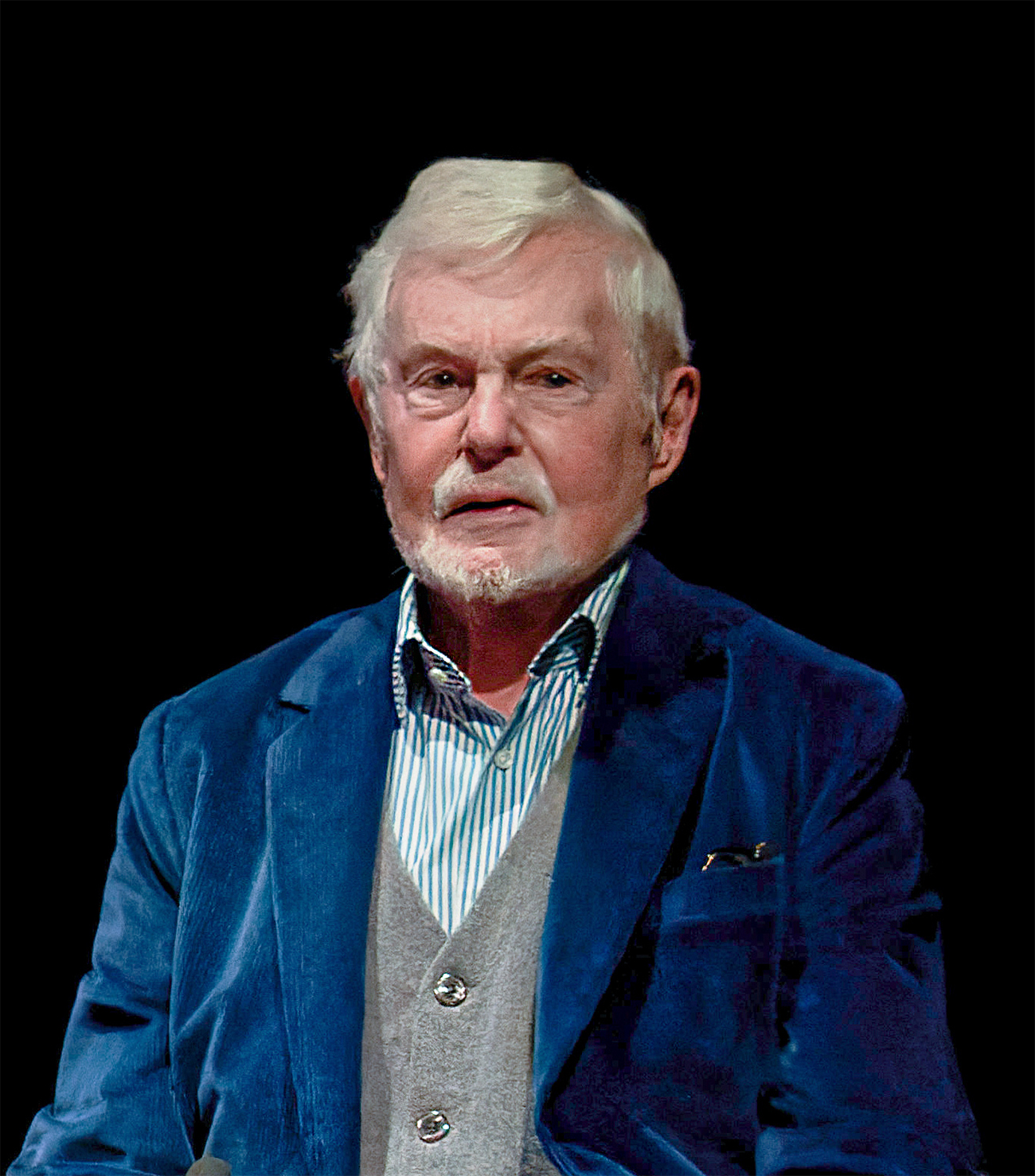
Sir Derek Jacobi won for Frasier (2001).

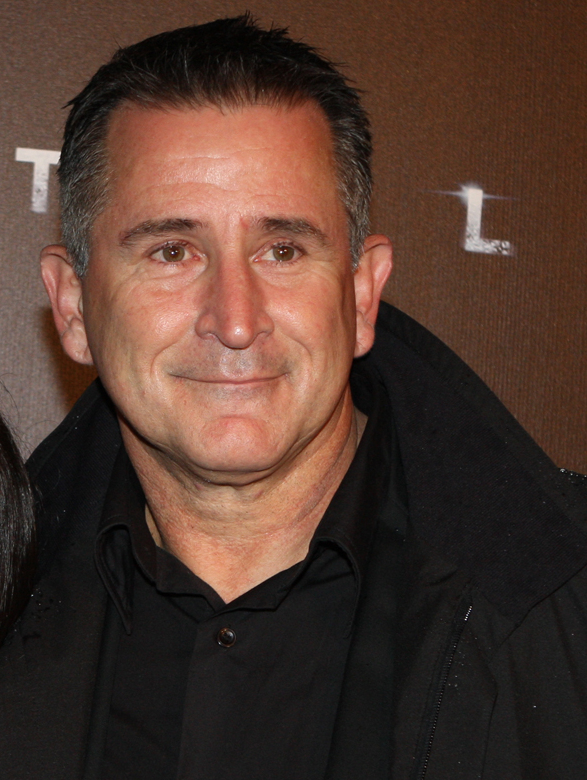
Anthony LaPaglia won for Frasier (2002).

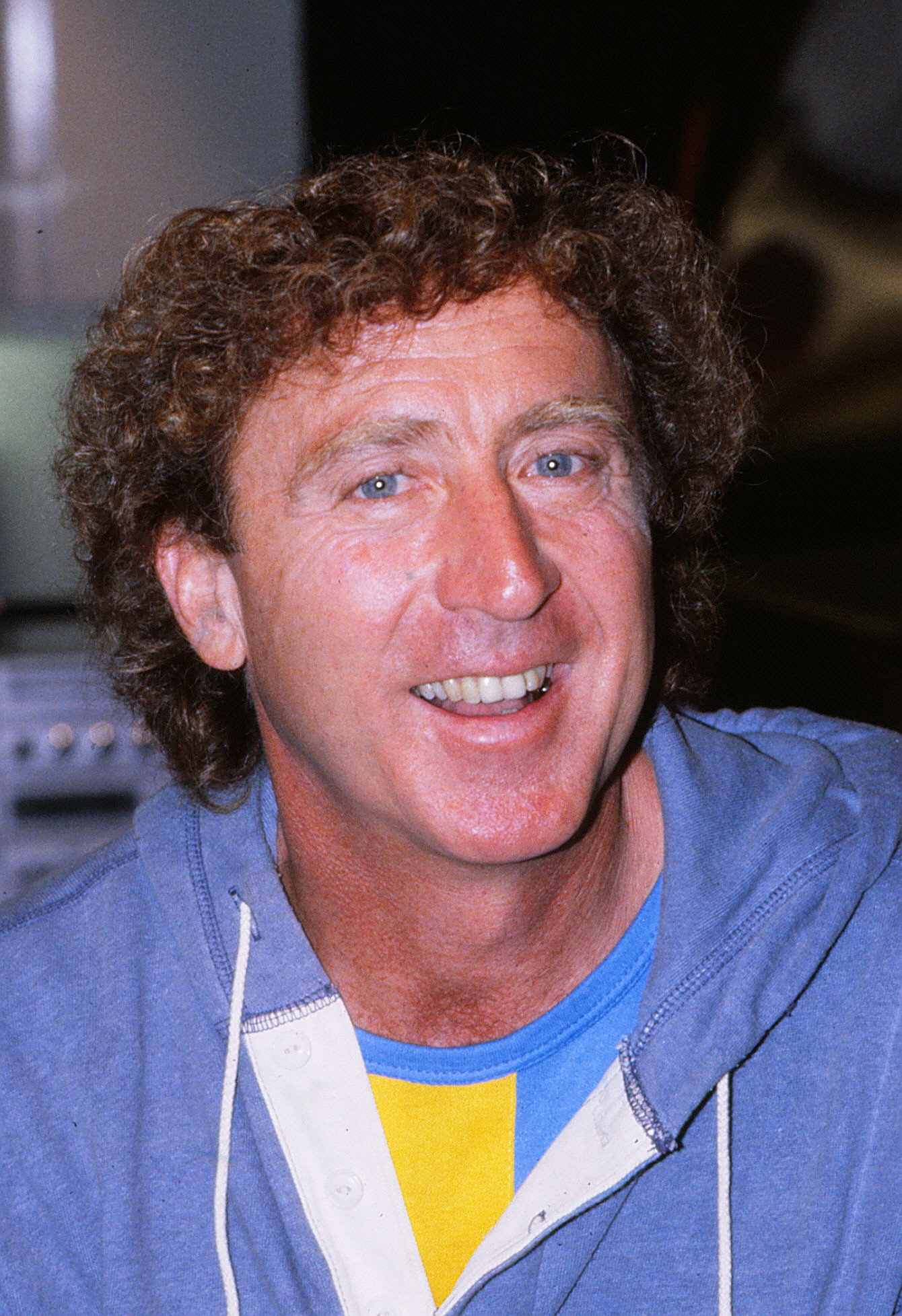
Gene Wilder won for Will & Grace (2003).

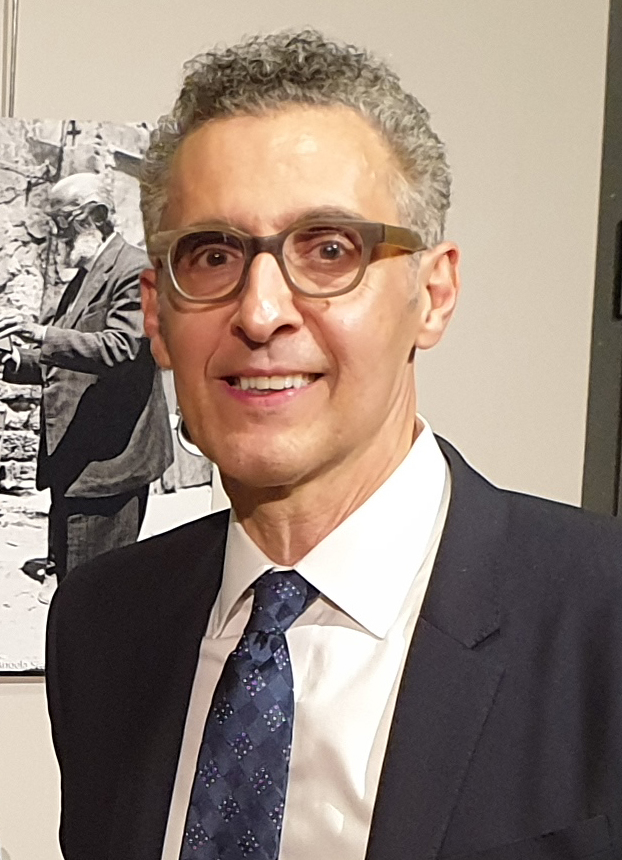
John Turturro won for Monk (2004).

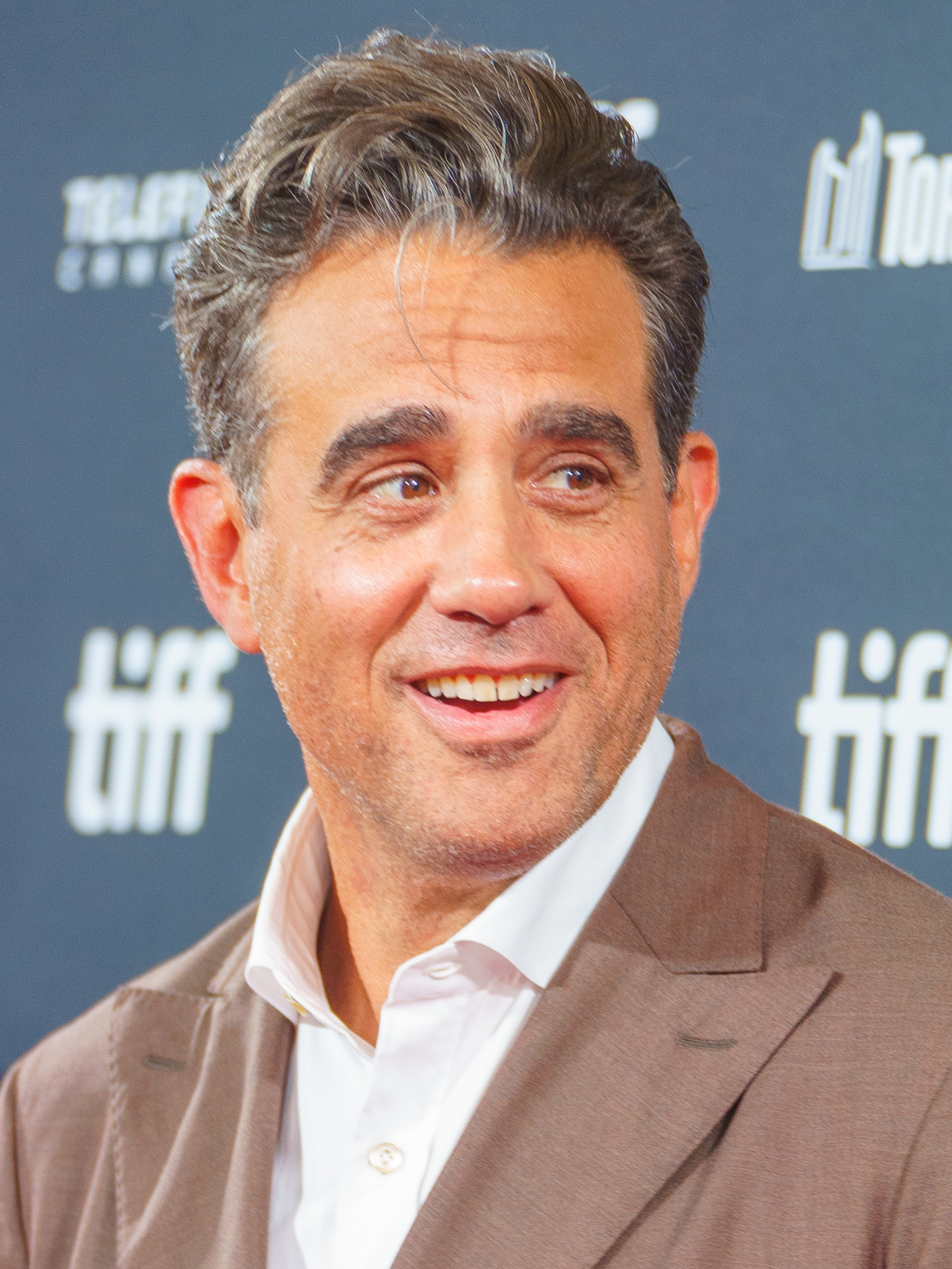
Bobby Cannavale won for Will & Grace (2006).

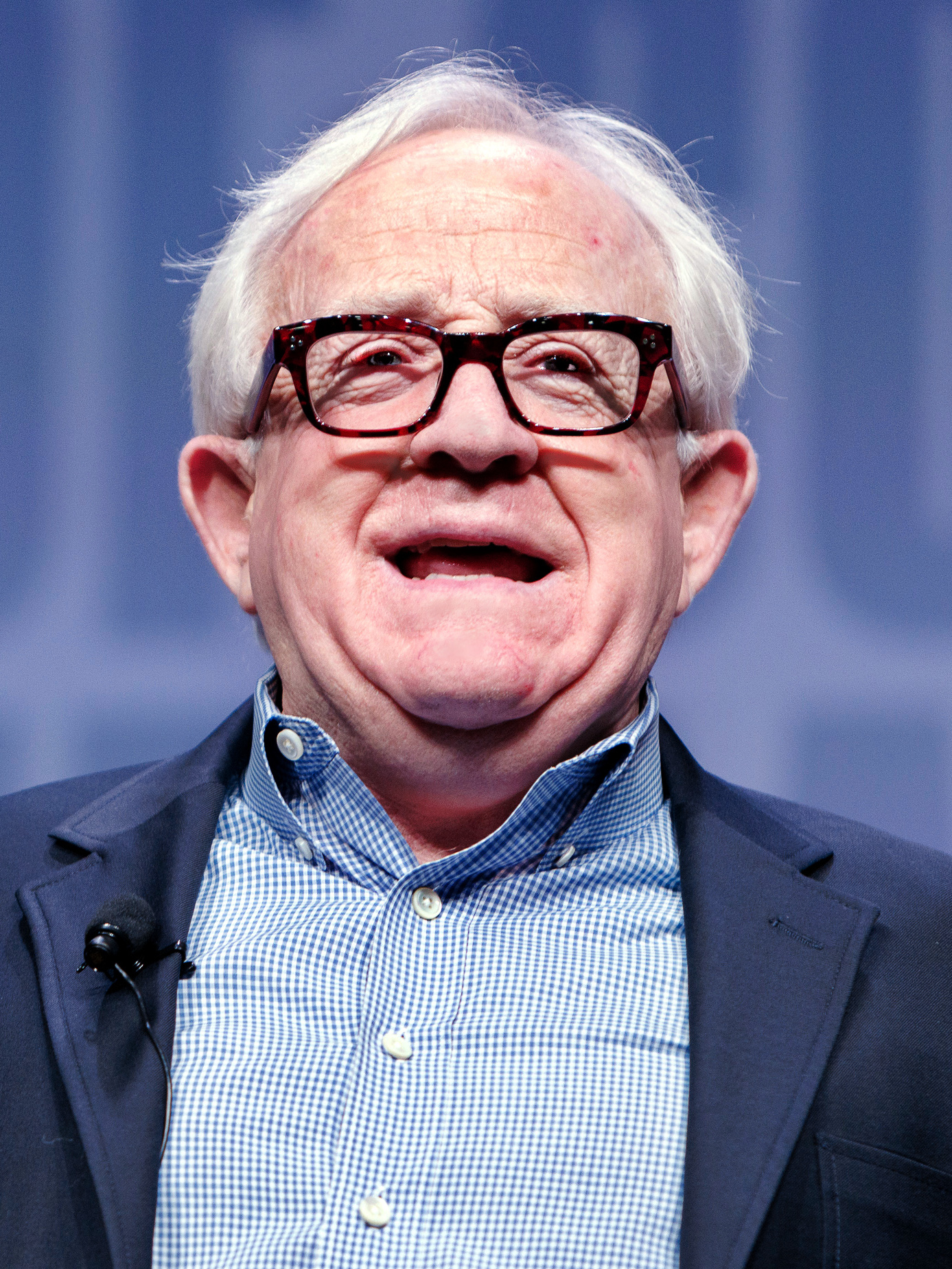
Leslie Jordan won for Will & Grace (2006).

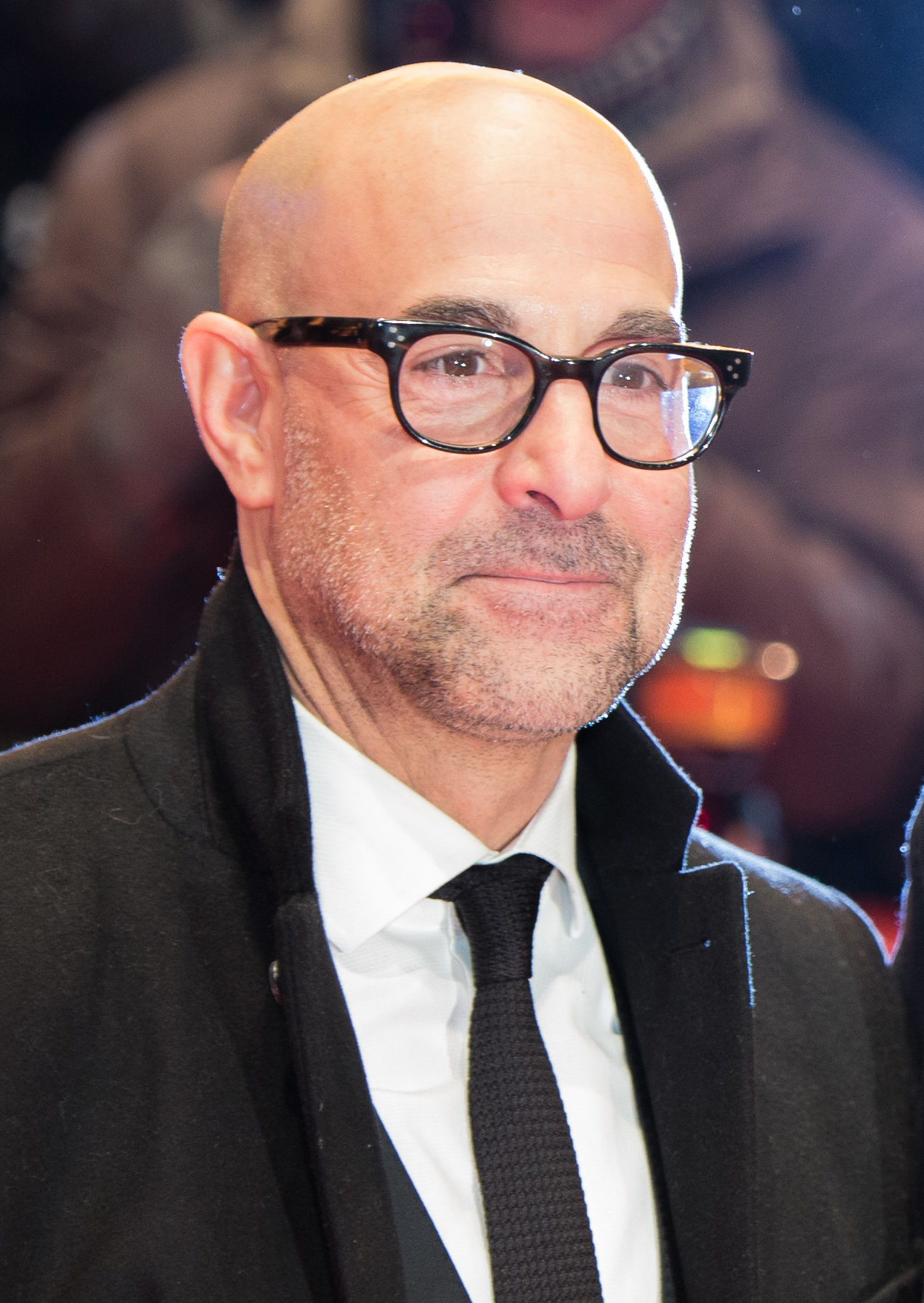
Stanley Tucci won for Monk (2007).

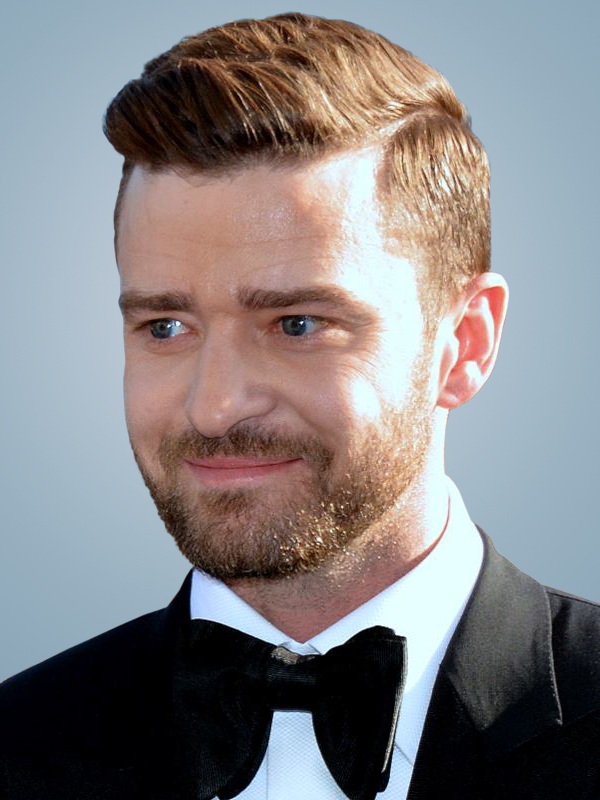
Justin Timberlake won twice for Saturday Night Live in 2009 and 2011.

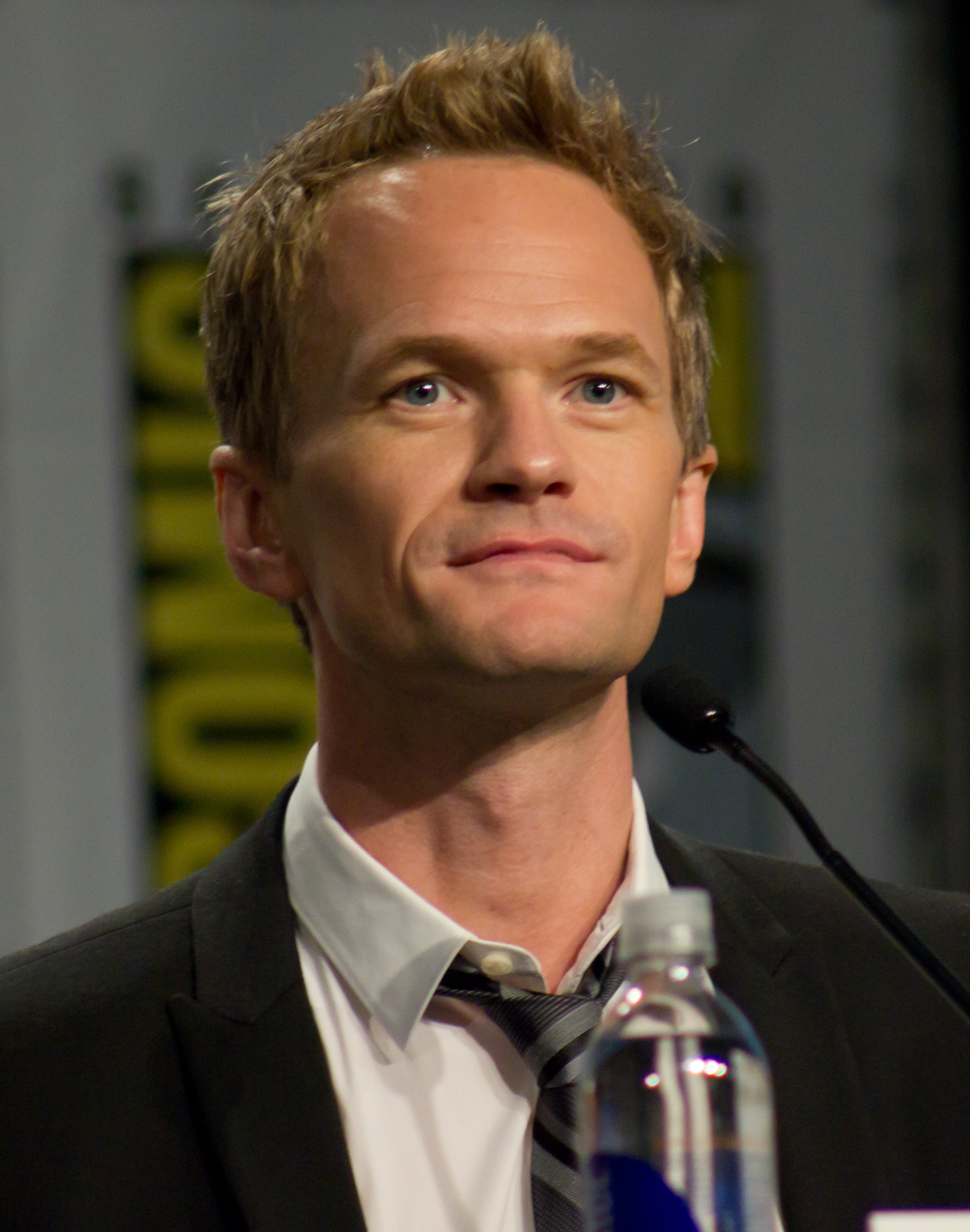
Neil Patrick Harris won for Glee (2010).

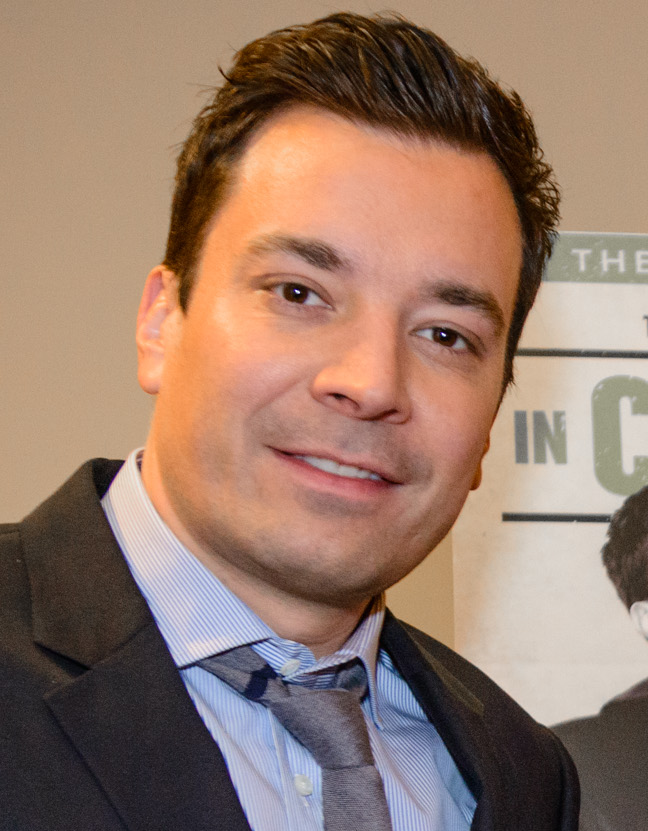
Jimmy Fallon won twice for Saturday Night Live in 2012 and 2014.

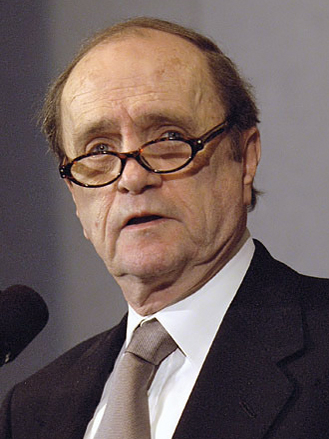
Bob Newhart won for The Big Bang Theory (2013).

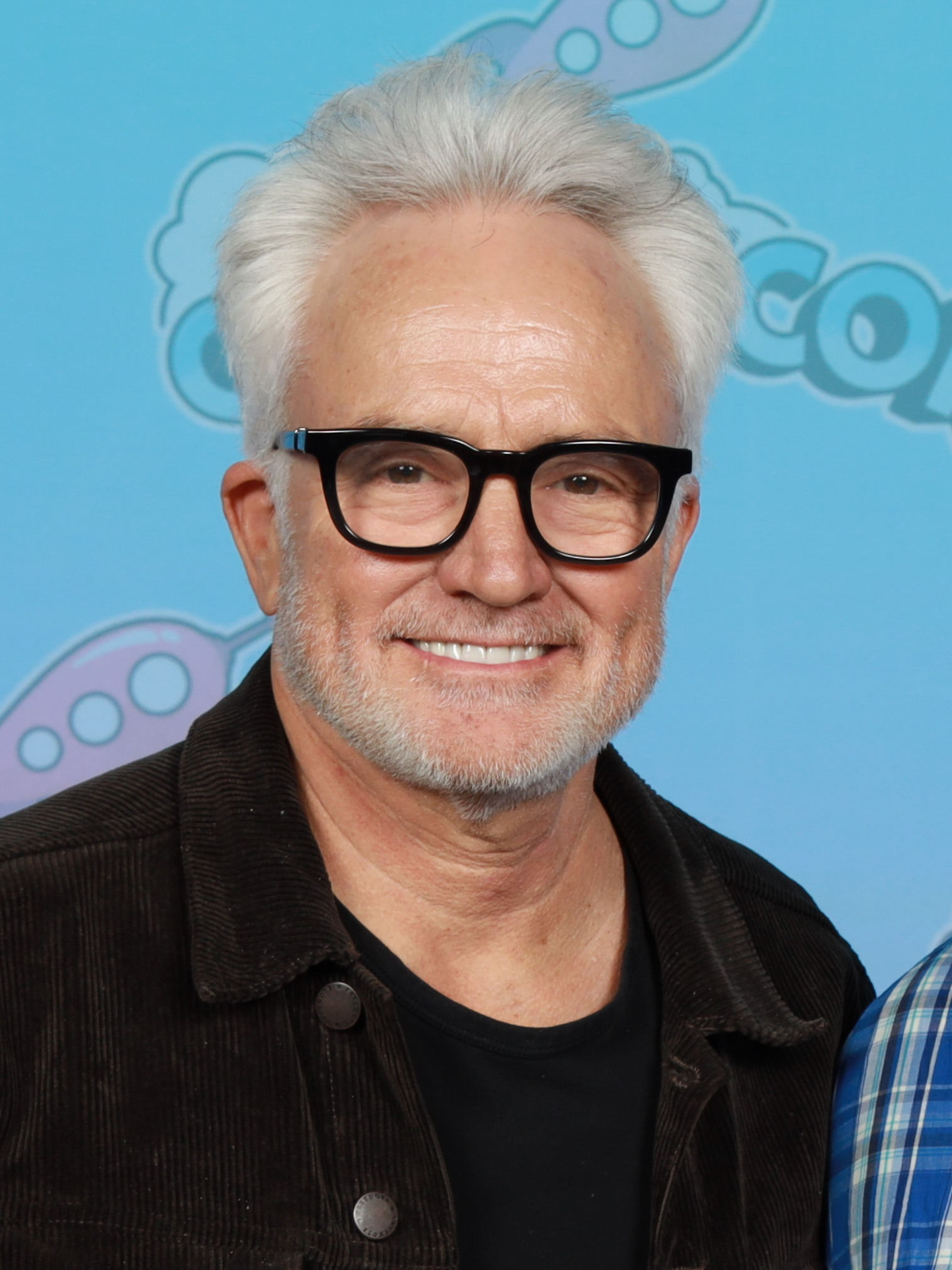
Bradley Whitford won for Transparent (2015).

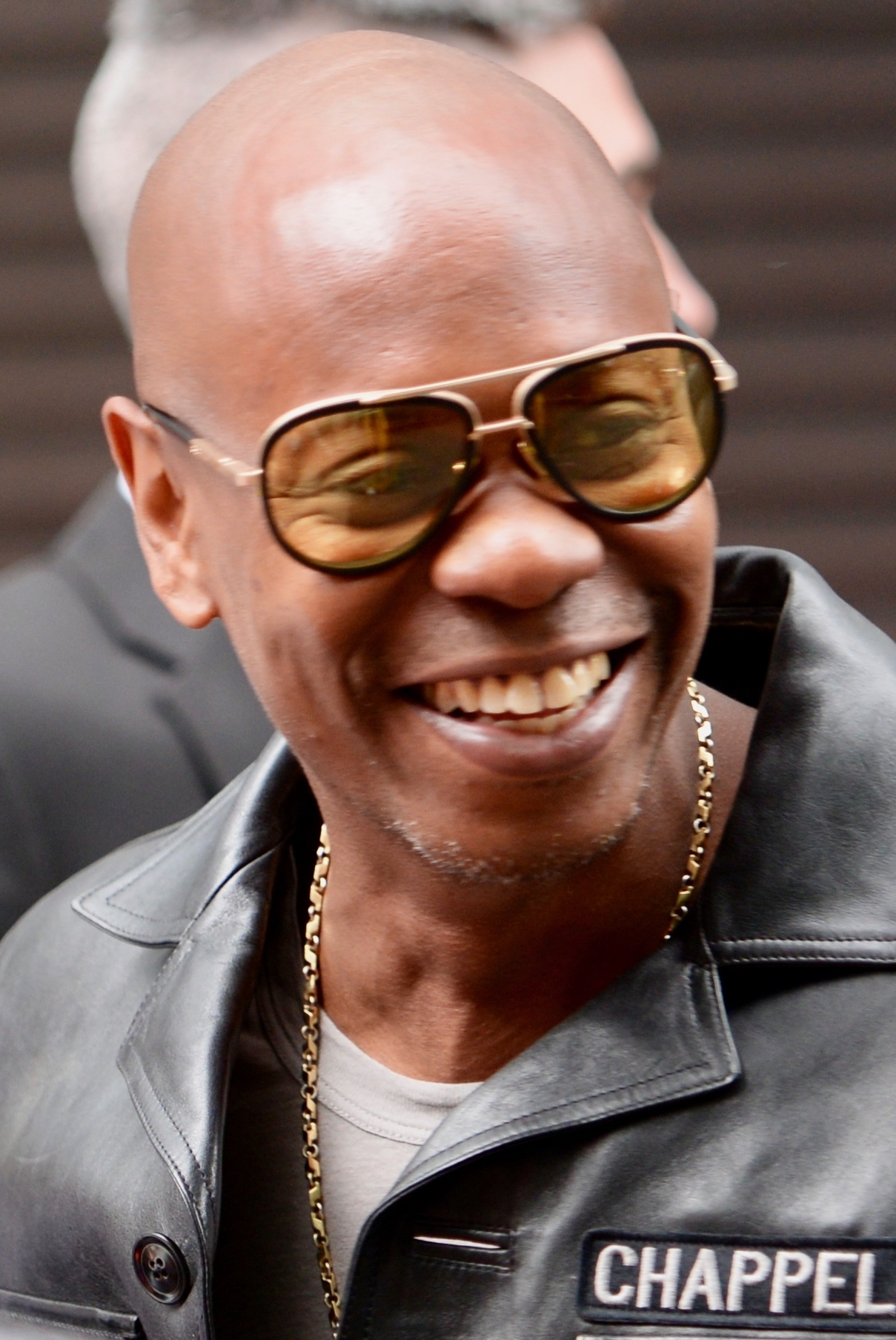
Dave Chappelle won twice for Saturday Night Live in 2017 and 2021.

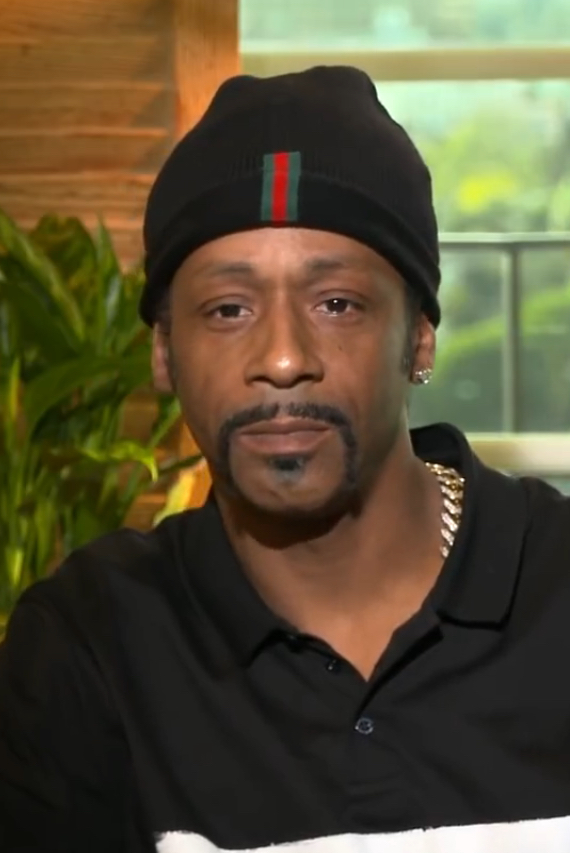
Katt Williams won for Atlanta (2018)

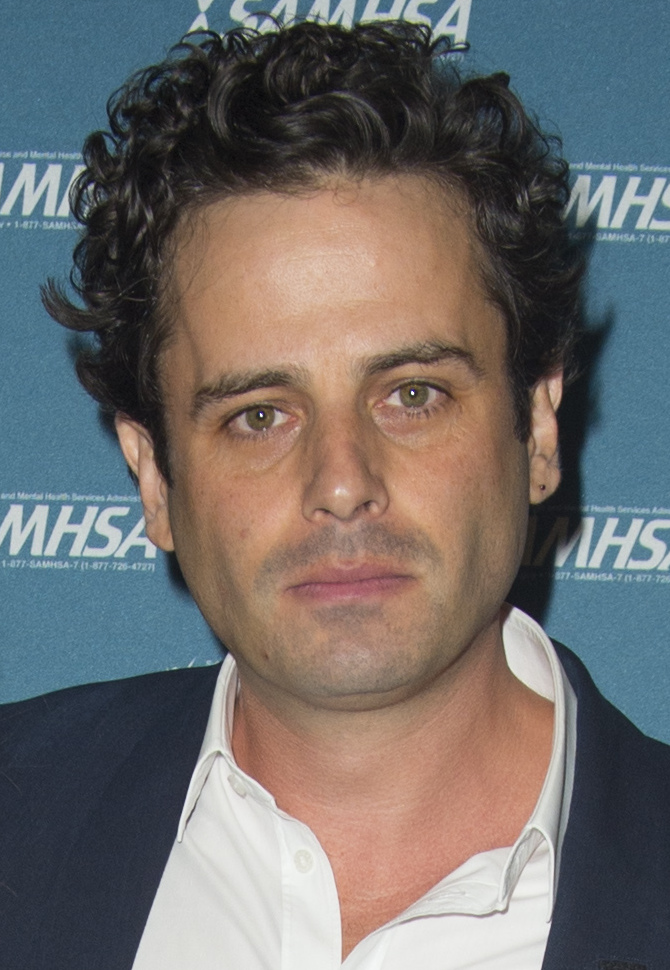
Luke Kirby won for The Marvelous Mrs. Maisel (2019)

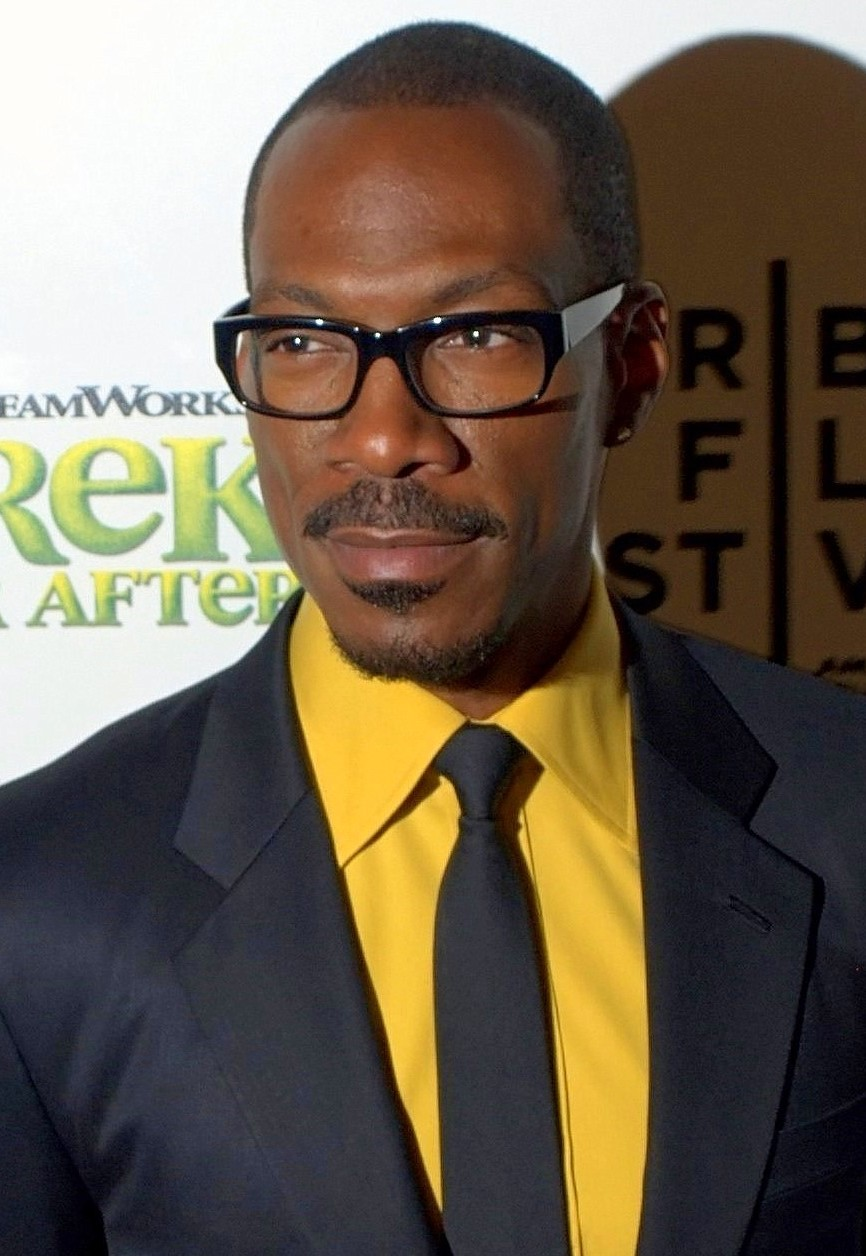
Eddie Murphy won for Saturday Night Live (2020)

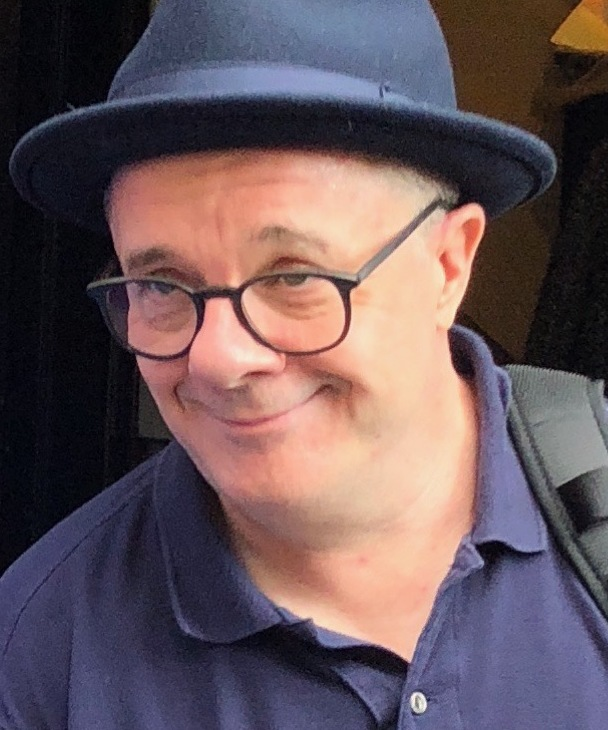
Nathan Lane won for Only Murders in the Building (2022)

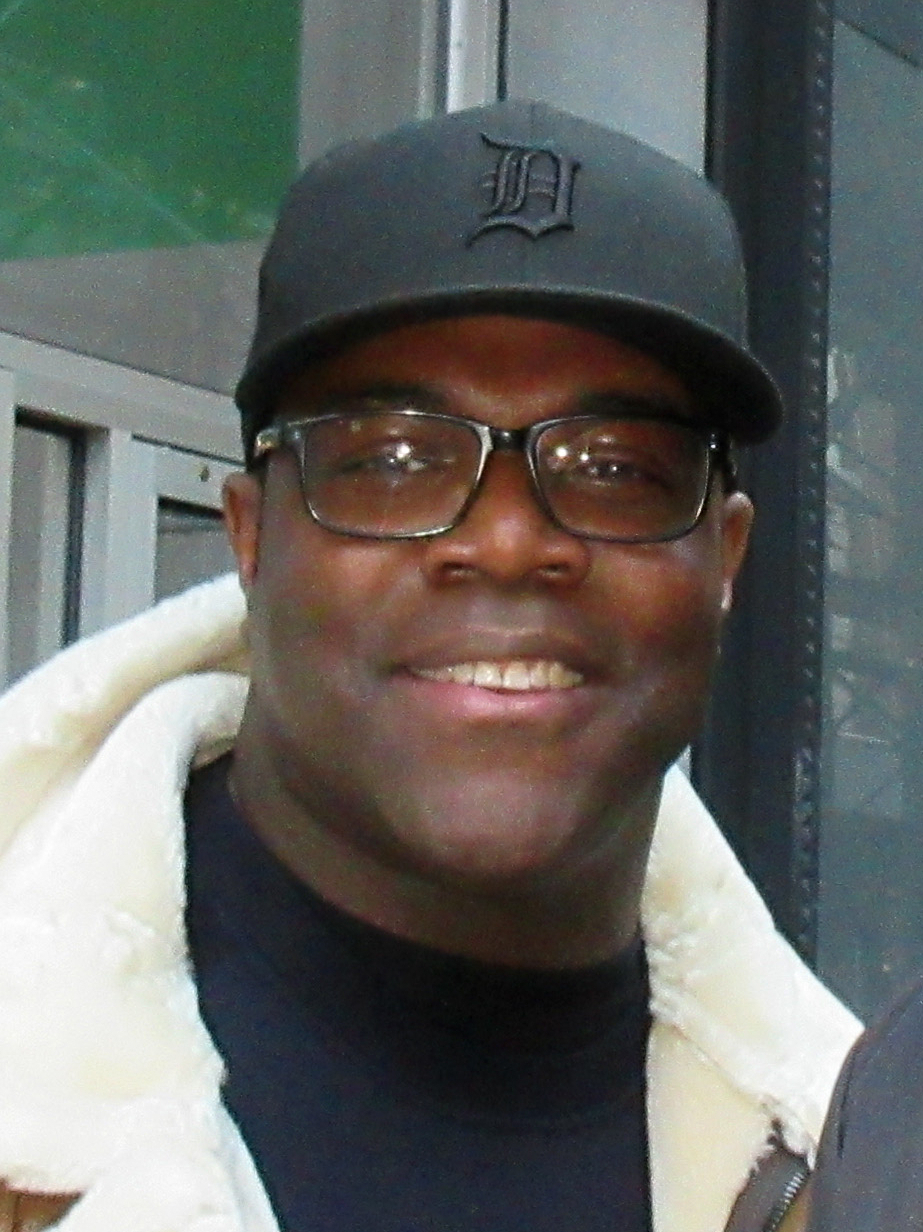
Sam Richardson won for Ted Lasso (2023)

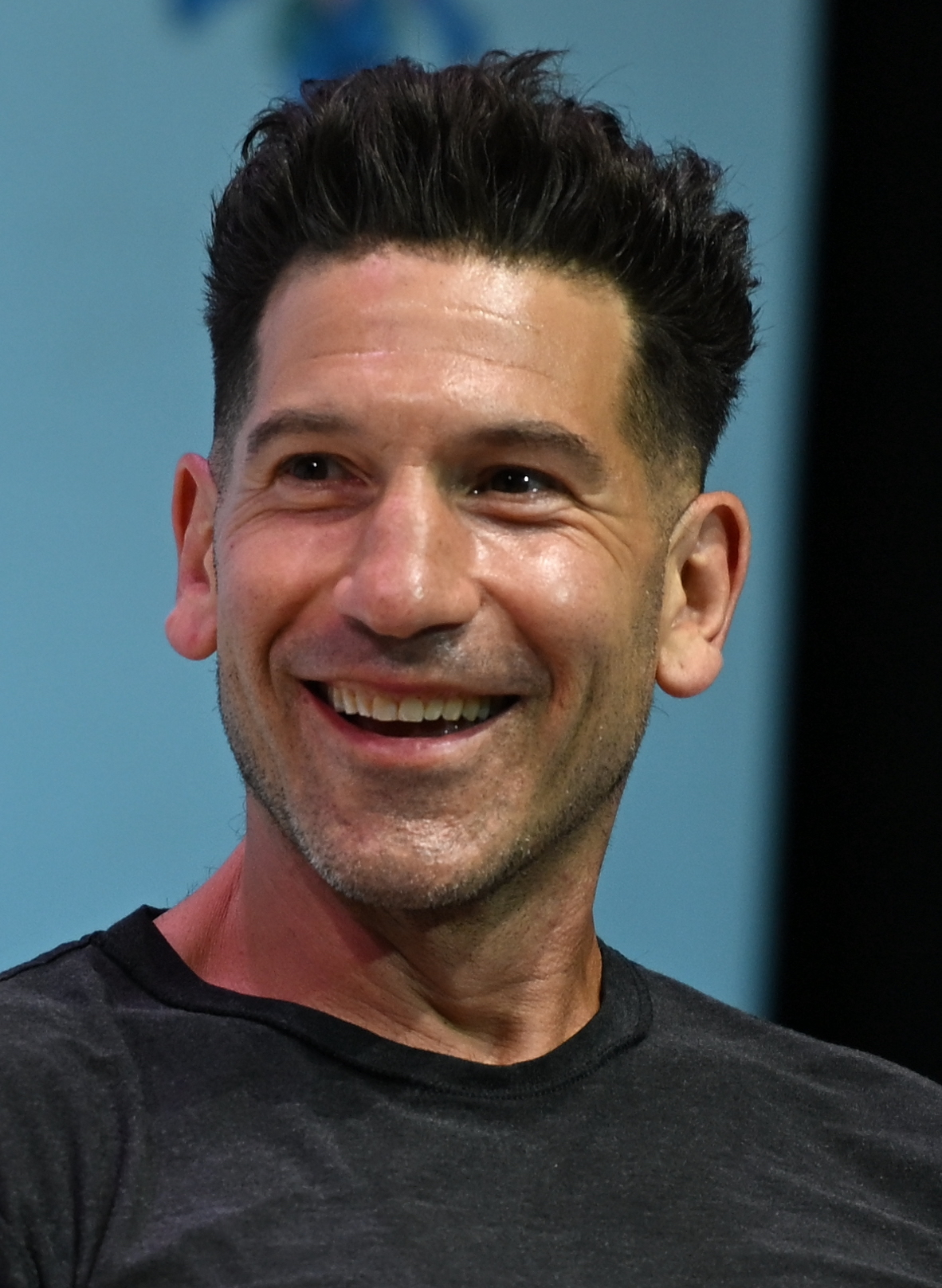
Jon Bernthal won for The Bear (2024)

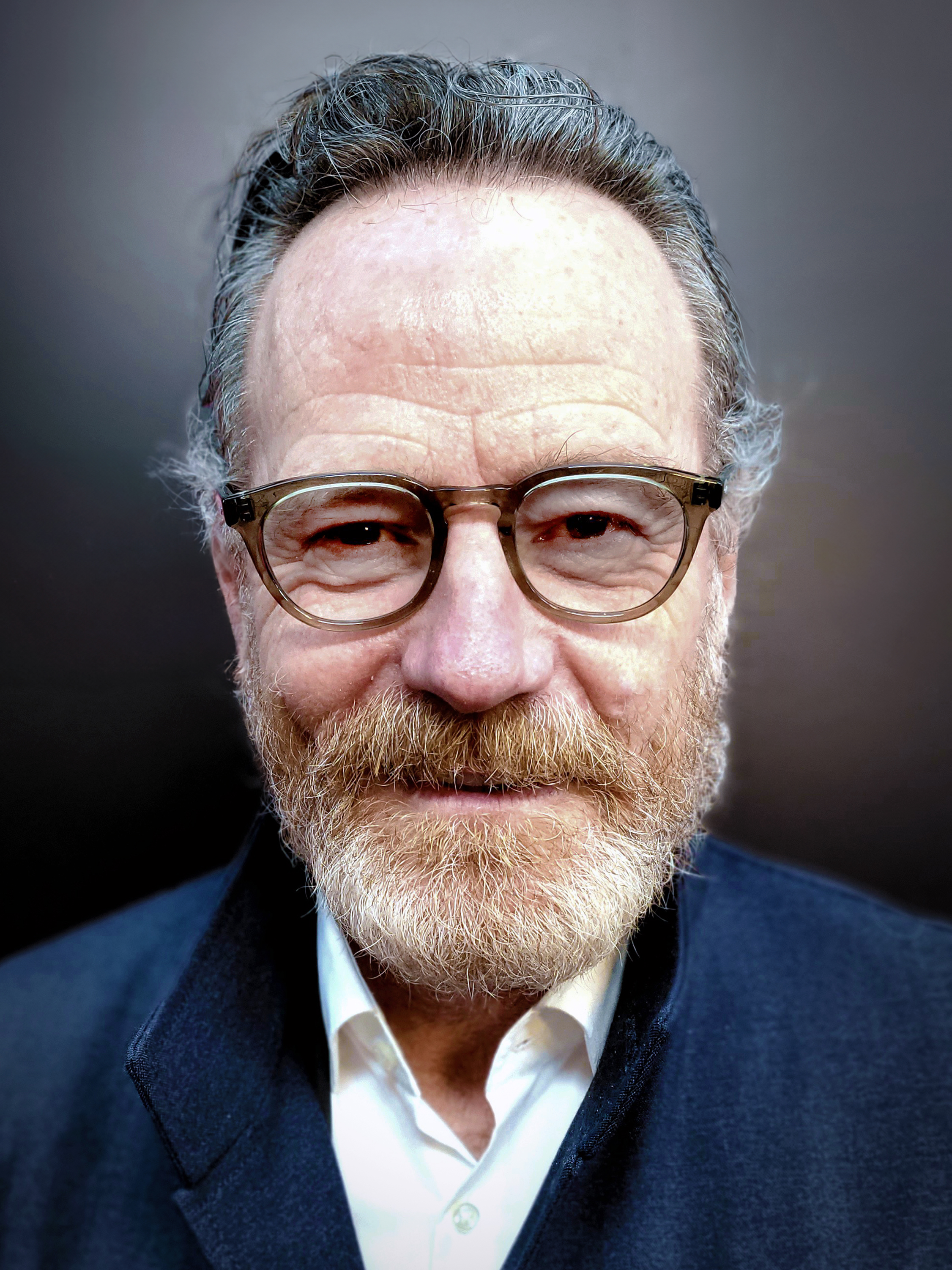
Bryan Cranston won for The Studio (2025)

=== 1970s ===
| Year | Actor | Program | Role | Submitted episode(s) | Network |
Outstanding Single Performance by a Supporting Actor in a Comedy or Drama Series
1975 (27th)
| 1975 (27th) | Patrick McGoohan | Columbo | Col. Lyle C. Rumford | "By Dawn's Early Light" | NBC |
| 1975 (27th) | Lew Ayres | Kung Fu | Beaumont | "The Vanishing Image" | ABC |
| 1975 (27th) | Harold Gould | Police Story | Andrea Basic | "Fathers and Sons" | NBC |
| 1975 (27th) | Harry Morgan | M*A*S*H | Maj. Gen. Bartford Hamilton Steele | "The General Flipped at Dawn" | CBS |
1976 (28th)
| 1976 (28th) | Outstanding Lead Actor for a Single Appearance in a Drama or Comedy Series | | | | |
| 1976 (28th) | Ed Asner | Rich Man, Poor Man | Axel Jordache | "Parts I" | ABC |
| 1976 (28th) | Bill Bixby | The Streets of San Francisco | Eric Doyle | "The Police Buff" | ABC |
| 1976 (28th) | Tony Musante | Medical Story | Dr. Paul Brandon | "The Quality of Mercy" | NBC |
| 1976 (28th) | Robert Reed | Medical Center | Dr. Pat Caddison | "John Quincy Adams, Diplomat" | CBS |
| 1976 (28th) | Outstanding Single Performance by a Supporting Actor in a Comedy or Drama Series | | | | |
| 1976 (28th) | Gordon Jackson | Upstairs, Downstairs | Hudson | "The Beastly Hun" | PBS |
| 1976 (28th) | Bill Bixby | Rich Man, Poor Man | Willie Abbott | "Part VI" | ABC |
| 1976 (28th) | Roscoe Lee Browne | Barney Miller | Charlie Jeffers | "The Escape Artist" | ABC |
| 1976 (28th) | Norman Fell | Rich Man, Poor Man | Smitty | "Part V" | ABC |
| 1976 (28th) | Van Johnson | Rich Man, Poor Man | Marsh Goodwin | "Parts VII" | ABC |
1977 (29th)
| 1977 (29th) | Outstanding Lead Actor for a Single Appearance in a Drama or Comedy Series | | | | |
| 1977 (29th) | Louis Gossett Jr. | Roots | Fiddler | "Part IV" | ABC |
| 1977 (29th) | John Amos | Roots | Toby | "Part V" | ABC |
| 1977 (29th) | LeVar Burton | Roots | Kunta Kinte | "Part I" | ABC |
| 1977 (29th) | Ben Vereen | Roots | "Chicken" George Moore | "Part VI" | ABC |
| 1977 (29th) | Outstanding Single Performance by a Supporting Actor in a Comedy or Drama Series | | | | |
| 1977 (29th) | Ed Asner | Roots | Capt. Davies | "Part 1" | ABC |
| 1977 (29th) | Charles Durning | Captains and the Kings | Billy Rice | "Chapter 2" | NBC |
| 1977 (29th) | Moses Gunn | Roots | Kintango | "Part I" | ABC |
| 1977 (29th) | Robert Reed | Roots | Dr. William Reynolds | "Part V" | ABC |
| 1977 (29th) | Ralph Waite | Roots | Third mate Slater | "Part I" | ABC |
1978 (30th)
| 1978 (30th) | Outstanding Lead Actor for a Single Appearance in a Drama or Comedy Series | | | | |
| 1978 (30th) | Barnard Hughes | Lou Grant | Judge Felix Rushman | "Judge" | CBS |
| 1978 (30th) | David Cassidy | Police Story | Officer Dan Shay | "A Chance to Live" | NBC |
| 1978 (30th) | Will Geer | The Love Boat | Franklyn Bootherstone | "The Old Man and the Runaway" | ABC |
| 1978 (30th) | Judd Hirsch | Rhoda | Mike Andretti | "Rhoda Likes Mike" | CBS |
| 1978 (30th) | John Rubinstein | Family | Jeff Maitland | "And Baby Makes Three" | ABC |
| 1978 (30th) | Keenan Wynn | Police Woman | Ben Fletcher | "Good Old Uncle Ben" | NBC |
| 1978 (30th) | Outstanding Single Performance by a Supporting Actor in a Comedy or Drama Series | | | | |
| 1978 (30th) | Ricardo Montalbán | How the West Was Won | Satangkai | "Part I" | ABC |
| 1978 (30th) | Will Geer | Eight is Enough | Santa Claus | "Yes, Nicholas... There is a Santa Claus" | ABC |
| 1978 (30th) | Larry Gelman | Barney Miller | Edward Sellers | "Goodbye, Mr. Fish" | ABC |
| 1978 (30th) | Harold Gould | Rhoda | Martin Morgenstern | "Happy Anniversary" | CBS |
| 1978 (30th) | Abe Vigoda | Barney Miller | Det. Phil Fish | "Goodbye, Mr. Fish" | ABC |

=== 1980s ===
| Year | Actor/Actress | Program | Role | Network |
Outstanding Guest Performer in a Comedy Series
1986 (38th)
| 1986 (38th) | Roscoe Lee Browne | The Cosby Show | Dr. Barnabus Foster | NBC |
| 1986 (38th) | Earle Hyman | The Cosby Show | Russell Huxtable | NBC |
| 1986 (38th) | Danny Kaye | The Cosby Show | Dr. Burns | NBC |
| 1986 (38th) | Clarice Taylor | The Cosby Show | Anna Huxtable | NBC |
| 1986 (38th) | Stevie Wonder | The Cosby Show | Himself | NBC |
1987 (39th)
| 1987 (39th) | John Cleese | Cheers | Dr. Simon Finch-Royce | NBC |
| 1987 (39th) | Art Carney | The Cavanaughs | James "Weasel" Cavanaugh | CBS |
| 1987 (39th) | Herb Edelman | The Golden Girls | Stan Zbornak | NBC |
| 1987 (39th) | Lois Nettleton | The Golden Girls | Jean | NBC |
| 1987 (39th) | Nancy Walker | The Golden Girls | Angela | NBC |
1988 (40th)
| 1988 (40th) | Beah Richards | Frank's Place | Mrs. Varden | CBS |
| 1988 (40th) | Herb Edelman | The Golden Girls | Stan Zbornak | NBC |
| 1988 (40th) | Geraldine Fitzgerald | The Golden Girls | Anna | NBC |
| 1988 (40th) | Eileen Heckart | The Cosby Show | Mrs. Hickson | NBC |
| 1988 (40th) | Gilda Radner | It's Garry Shandling's Show | Herself | Showtime |
Outstanding Guest Actor in a Comedy Series
1989 (41st)
| 1989 (41st) | Cleavon Little | Dear John | Tony Larkin | NBC |
| 1989 (41st) | Sammy Davis Jr. | The Cosby Show | Ray Palomino | NBC |
| 1989 (41st) | Jack Gilford | The Golden Girls | Max Weinstock | NBC |
| 1989 (41st) | Leslie Nielsen | Day by Day | Jack Harper | NBC |
| 1989 (41st) | Robert Picardo | The Wonder Years | Mr. Cutlip | ABC |

=== 1990s ===
| Year | Actor | Program | Role | Network |
|---|---|---|---|---|
1990 (42nd)
| 1990 (42nd) | Jay Thomas | Murphy Brown | Jerry Gold | CBS |
| 1990 (42nd) | David Huddleston | The Wonder Years | Grandpa Arnold | ABC |
| 1990 (42nd) | Darren McGavin | Murphy Brown | Bill Brown | CBS |
| 1990 (42nd) | Jerry Orbach | The Golden Girls | Glenn O'Brien | NBC |
| 1990 (42nd) | Dick Van Dyke | The Golden Girls | Ken Whittingham | NBC |
1991 (43rd)
| 1991 (43rd) | Jay Thomas | Murphy Brown | Jerry Gold | CBS |
| 1991 (43rd) | Sheldon Leonard | Cheers | Sid Nelson | NBC |
| 1991 (43rd) | Alan Oppenheimer | Murphy Brown | Eugene Kinsella | CBS |
| 1991 (43rd) | Tom Poston | Coach | Art Hibke | ABC |
| 1991 (43rd) | Danny Thomas (posthumous) | Empty Nest | Dr. Leo Brewster | NBC |
| 1992 (44th) | Harvey Fierstein (Note: Harvey Fierstein was nominated in the category of Outstanding Supporting Actor in a Comedy Series for his guest appearance on Cheers, but lost to Michael Jeter, who won for his role on Evening Shade.) | Cheers | Mark Newberger | NBC |
| 1992 (44th) | Kelsey Grammer (Note: Kelsey Grammer was nominated in the category of Outstanding Lead Actor in a Comedy Series for his guest appearance on Wings, but lost to Craig T. Nelson, who won for his role on Coach.) | Wings | Dr. Frasier Crane | NBC |
| 1992 (44th) | Jay Thomas (Note: Jay Thomas was nominated in the category of Outstanding Supporting Actor in a Comedy Series for his guest appearance on Murphy Brown, but lost to Michael Jeter, who won for his role on Evening Shade.) | Murphy Brown | Jerry Gold | CBS |
1993 (45th)
| 1993 (45th) | David Clennon | Dream On | Peter Brewer | HBO |
| 1993 (45th) | Tom Berenger | Cheers | Don Santry | NBC |
| 1993 (45th) | Dana Carvey | The Larry Sanders Show | Himself | HBO |
| 1993 (45th) | Bill Erwin | Seinfeld | Sid Fields | NBC |
| 1993 (45th) | Joel Grey | Brooklyn Bridge | Jacob Pressman | CBS |
1994 (46th)
| 1994 (46th) | Martin Sheen | Murphy Brown | Nick Brody | CBS |
| 1994 (46th) | Jason Alexander | Dream On | Randall Townsend | HBO |
| 1994 (46th) | Paul Dooley | Dream On | Mickey Tupper | HBO |
| 1994 (46th) | John Glover | Frasier | Ned Miller | NBC |
| 1994 (46th) | Judge Reinhold | Seinfeld | Aaron | NBC |
1995 (47th)
| 1995 (47th) | Carl Reiner | Mad About You | Alan Brady | NBC |
| 1995 (47th) | Sid Caesar | Love & War | Stein | CBS |
| 1995 (47th) | Nathan Lane | Frasier | Phil | NBC |
| 1995 (47th) | Robert Pastorelli | Murphy Brown | Eldin Bernecky | CBS |
| 1995 (47th) | Paul Reubens | Murphy Brown | Andrew J. Lansing III | CBS |
1996 (48th)
| 1996 (48th) | Tim Conway | Coach | Kenny Montague | ABC |
| 1996 (48th) | Griffin Dunne | Frasier | Bob | NBC |
| 1996 (48th) | Mandy Patinkin | The Larry Sanders Show | Himself | HBO |
| 1996 (48th) | Larry Thomas | Seinfeld | The Soup Nazi | NBC |
| 1996 (48th) | Harris Yulin | Frasier | Jerome Belasco | NBC |
1997 (49th)
| 1997 (49th) | Mel Brooks | Mad About You | Uncle Phil | NBC |
| 1997 (49th) | Sid Caesar | Mad About You | Uncle Harold | NBC |
| 1997 (49th) | David Duchovny | The Larry Sanders Show | Himself | HBO |
| 1997 (49th) | James Earl Jones | Frasier | Norman | NBC |
| 1997 (49th) | Jerry Stiller | Seinfeld | Frank Costanza | NBC |
1998 (50th)
| 1998 (50th) | Mel Brooks | Mad About You | Uncle Phil | NBC |
| 1998 (50th) | Hank Azaria | Mad About You | Nat | NBC |
| 1998 (50th) | Lloyd Bridges (posthumous) | Seinfeld | Izzy Mandelbaum | NBC |
| 1998 (50th) | John Cleese | 3rd Rock from the Sun | Dr. Liam Neesam | NBC |
| 1998 (50th) | Nathan Lane | Mad About You | Nathan Twilley | NBC |
1999 (51st)
| 1999 (51st) | Mel Brooks | Mad About You | Uncle Phil | NBC |
| 1999 (51st) | Woody Harrelson | Frasier | Woody Boyd | NBC |
| 1999 (51st) | Charles Nelson Reilly | The Drew Carey Show | Mr. Hathaway | ABC |
| 1999 (51st) | John Ritter | Ally McBeal | George Madison | Fox |
| 1999 (51st) | William Shatner | 3rd Rock from the Sun: Dick's Big Giant Headache | Big Giant Head | NBC |

=== 2000s ===
| Year | Actor | Program | Role | Network |
|---|---|---|---|---|
2000 (52nd)
| 2000 (52nd) | Bruce Willis | Friends | Paul Stevens | NBC |
| 2000 (52nd) | Anthony LaPaglia | Frasier | Simon Moon | NBC |
| 2000 (52nd) | William H. Macy (Note: In 2000, Henry Winkler was nominated for the canceled NBC sitcom Battery Park. After the Television Academy learned that his episode aired in June — after the May 31 cut-off — Winkler was ruled ineligible and sixth place finisher William H. Macy received the nomination in his place.) | Sports Night | Sam Donovan | ABC |
| 2000 (52nd) | Carl Reiner | Beggars and Choosers | Sid Barry | Showtime |
| 2000 (52nd) | Tom Selleck | Friends | Dr. Richard Burke | NBC |
2001 (53rd)
| 2001 (53rd) | Derek Jacobi | Frasier | Jackson Hedley | NBC |
| 2001 (53rd) | Victor Garber | Frasier | Ferguson | NBC |
| 2001 (53rd) | Robert Loggia | Malcolm in the Middle | Grandpa Victor | Fox |
| 2001 (53rd) | Gary Oldman | Friends | Richard Crosby | NBC |
| 2001 (53rd) | Michael York | The Lot | Colin Rhome | AMC |
2002 (54th)
| 2002 (54th) | Anthony LaPaglia | Frasier | Simon Moon | NBC |
| 2002 (54th) | Adam Arkin | Frasier | Tom | NBC |
| 2002 (54th) | Brian Cox | Frasier | Harry Moon | NBC |
| 2002 (54th) | Michael Douglas | Will & Grace | Det. Gavin Hatch | NBC |
| 2002 (54th) | Brad Pitt | Friends | Will Colbert | NBC |
2003 (55th)
| 2003 (55th) | Gene Wilder | Will & Grace | Mr. Stein | NBC |
| 2003 (55th) | Hank Azaria | Friends | David | NBC |
| 2003 (55th) | David Duchovny | Life with Bonnie | Johnny Volcano | ABC |
| 2003 (55th) | Fred Willard | Everybody Loves Raymond | Hank MacDougall | CBS |
| 2003 (55th) | Jonathan Winters | Life with Bonnie | Q.T. Marlens | ABC |
2004 (56th)
| 2004 (56th) | John Turturro | Monk | Ambrose Monk | USA |
| 2004 (56th) | John Cleese | Will & Grace | Lyle Finster | NBC |
| 2004 (56th) | Danny DeVito | Friends | Roy Goodbody | NBC |
| 2004 (56th) | Anthony LaPaglia | Frasier | Simon Moon | NBC |
| 2004 (56th) | Fred Willard | Everybody Loves Raymond | Hank MacDougall | CBS |
2005 (57th)
| 2005 (57th) | Bobby Cannavale | Will & Grace | Vince D'Angelo | NBC |
| 2005 (57th) | Alec Baldwin | Will & Grace | Malcolm | NBC |
| 2005 (57th) | Victor Garber | Will & Grace | Peter Bovington | NBC |
| 2005 (57th) | Jeff Goldblum | Will & Grace | Scott Woolley | NBC |
| 2005 (57th) | Fred Willard | Everybody Loves Raymond | Hank MacDougall | CBS |
2006 (58th)
| 2006 (58th) | Leslie Jordan | Will & Grace | Beverley Leslie | NBC |
| 2006 (58th) | Alec Baldwin | Will & Grace | Malcolm | NBC |
| 2006 (58th) | Martin Sheen | Two and a Half Men | Harvey | CBS |
| 2006 (58th) | Patrick Stewart | Extras | Himself | HBO |
| 2006 (58th) | Ben Stiller | Extras | Himself | HBO |
2007 (59th)
| 2007 (59th) | Stanley Tucci | Monk | David Ruskin | USA |
| 2007 (59th) | Beau Bridges | My Name Is Earl | Carl Hickey | NBC |
| 2007 (59th) | Martin Landau | Entourage | Bob Ryan | HBO |
| 2007 (59th) | Ian McKellen | Extras | Himself | HBO |
| 2007 (59th) | Giovanni Ribisi | My Name Is Earl | Ralph Mariano | NBC |
2008 (60th)
| 2008 (60th) | Tim Conway | 30 Rock | Bucky Bright | NBC |
| 2008 (60th) | Will Arnett | 30 Rock | Devon Banks | NBC |
| 2008 (60th) | Shelley Berman | Curb Your Enthusiasm | Nat David | HBO |
| 2008 (60th) | Steve Buscemi | 30 Rock | Lenny Wosniak | NBC |
| 2008 (60th) | Rip Torn | 30 Rock | Don Geiss | NBC |
2009 (61st)
| 2009 (61st) | Justin Timberlake | Saturday Night Live | Various characters | NBC |
| 2009 (61st) | Alan Alda | 30 Rock | Milton Greene | NBC |
| 2009 (61st) | Beau Bridges | Desperate Housewives | Eli Scruggs | ABC |
| 2009 (61st) | Jon Hamm | 30 Rock | Dr. Drew Baird | NBC |
| 2009 (61st) | Steve Martin | 30 Rock | Gavin Volure | NBC |

=== 2010s ===
| Year | Actor | Program | Role | Episode | Network |
|---|---|---|---|---|---|
2010 (62nd)
| 2010 (62nd) | Neil Patrick Harris | Glee | Bryan Ryan | "Dream On" | Fox |
| 2010 (62nd) | Will Arnett | 30 Rock | Devon Banks | "Into the Crevasse" | NBC |
| 2010 (62nd) | Jon Hamm | 30 Rock | Dr. Drew Baird | "Emanuelle Goes to Dinosaur Land" | NBC |
| 2010 (62nd) | Mike O'Malley | Glee | Burt Hummel | "Wheels" | Fox |
| 2010 (62nd) | Eli Wallach | Nurse Jackie | Bernard Zimberg | "Chicken Soup" | Showtime |
| 2010 (62nd) | Fred Willard | Modern Family | Frank Dunphy | "Travels with Scout" | ABC |
2011 (63rd)
| 2011 (63rd) | Justin Timberlake | Saturday Night Live | Various Characters | "Host: Justin Timberlake" | NBC |
| 2011 (63rd) | Will Arnett | 30 Rock | Devon Banks | "Plan B" | NBC |
| 2011 (63rd) | Matt Damon | 30 Rock | Carol Burnett | "Double-Edged Sword" | NBC |
| 2011 (63rd) | Idris Elba | The Big C | Lenny Charles | "Blue-Eyed Iris" | Showtime |
| 2011 (63rd) | Zach Galifianakis | Saturday Night Live | Various Characters | "Host: Zach Galifianakis" | NBC |
| 2011 (63rd) | Nathan Lane | Modern Family | Pepper Saltzman | "Boys' Night" | ABC |
2012 (64th)
| 2012 (64th) | Jimmy Fallon | Saturday Night Live | Various Characters | "Host: Jimmy Fallon" | NBC |
| 2012 (64th) | Will Arnett | 30 Rock | Devon Banks | "Idiots Are People Three!" | NBC |
| 2012 (64th) | Bobby Cannavale | Nurse Jackie | Dr. Mike Cruz | "Disneyland Sucks" | Showtime |
| 2012 (64th) | Michael J. Fox | Curb Your Enthusiasm | Michael J. Fox | "Larry vs. Michael J. Fox" | HBO |
| 2012 (64th) | Jon Hamm | 30 Rock | Abner / David Brinkley | "Live from Studio 6H" | NBC |
| 2012 (64th) | Greg Kinnear | Modern Family | Tad Murray | "Me? Jealous?" | ABC |
2013 (65th)
| 2013 (65th) | Bob Newhart | The Big Bang Theory | Arthur Jeffries | "The Proton Resurgence" | CBS |
| 2013 (65th) | Louis C.K. | Saturday Night Live | Various Characters | "Host: Louis C.K." | NBC |
| 2013 (65th) | Bobby Cannavale | Nurse Jackie | Dr. Mike Cruz | "Walk of Shame" | Showtime |
| 2013 (65th) | Will Forte | 30 Rock | Paul L'astnamé | "My Whole Life Is Thunder" | NBC |
| 2013 (65th) | Nathan Lane | Modern Family | Pepper Saltzman | "A Slight at the Opera" | ABC |
| 2013 (65th) | Justin Timberlake | Saturday Night Live | Various Characters | "Host: Justin Timberlake" | NBC |
2014 (66th)
| 2014 (66th) | Jimmy Fallon | Saturday Night Live | Various Characters | "Host: Jimmy Fallon" | NBC |
| 2014 (66th) | Steve Buscemi | Portlandia | Marty | "Celery" | IFC |
| 2014 (66th) | Louis C.K. | Saturday Night Live | Various Characters | "Host: Louis C.K." | NBC |
| 2014 (66th) | Gary Cole | Veep | Kent Davison | "Crate" | HBO |
| 2014 (66th) | Nathan Lane | Modern Family | Pepper Saltzman | "The Wedding" (Part 2) | ABC |
| 2014 (66th) | Bob Newhart | The Big Bang Theory | Arthur Jeffries | "The Proton Transmogrification" | CBS |
2015 (67th)
| 2015 (67th) | Bradley Whitford | Transparent | Marcy May | "Best New Girl" | Amazon |
| 2015 (67th) | Mel Brooks | The Comedians | Mel Brooks | "Celebrity Guest" | FX |
| 2015 (67th) | Louis C.K. | Saturday Night Live | Various Characters | "Host: Louis C.K." | NBC |
| 2015 (67th) | Paul Giamatti | Inside Amy Schumer | Juror #10 | "12 Angry Men Inside Amy Schumer" | Comedy Central |
| 2015 (67th) | Bill Hader | Saturday Night Live | Various Characters | "Host: Bill Hader" | NBC |
| 2015 (67th) | Jon Hamm | Unbreakable Kimmy Schmidt | Richard Wayne Gary Wayne | "Kimmy Makes Waffles!" | Netflix |
2016 (68th)
| 2016 (68th) | Peter Scolari (Note: In 2016, Peter MacNicol was nominated for the HBO series Veep. His nomination was rescinded after it was determined that MacNicol had appeared in five out of ten episodes in the fifth season of Veep, violating the TV Academy's rule that to be ruled eligible for a guest acting category, a performer must have appeared in "less than 50 percent" of a season's episodes. Seventh place finisher Peter Scolari received the nomination in his place, going on to win the category.) | Girls | Tad Horvath | "Good Man" | HBO |
| 2016 (68th) | Larry David | Saturday Night Live | Various Characters | "Host: Larry David" | NBC |
| 2016 (68th) | Tracy Morgan | Saturday Night Live | Various Characters | "Host: Tracy Morgan" | NBC |
| 2016 (68th) | Martin Mull | Veep | Bob Bradley | "The Eagle" | HBO |
| 2016 (68th) | Bob Newhart | The Big Bang Theory | Arthur Jeffries | "The Opening Night Excitation" | CBS |
| 2016 (68th) | Bradley Whitford | Transparent | Magnus Hirschfeld | "Oscillate" | Amazon |
2017 (69th)
| 2017 (69th) | Dave Chappelle | Saturday Night Live | Various Characters | "Host: Dave Chappelle" | NBC |
| 2017 (69th) | Riz Ahmed | Girls | Paul-Louis | "All I Ever Wanted" | HBO |
| 2017 (69th) | Tom Hanks | Saturday Night Live | Various Characters | "Host: Tom Hanks" | NBC |
| 2017 (69th) | Hugh Laurie | Veep | Tom James | "Blurb" | HBO |
| 2017 (69th) | Lin-Manuel Miranda | Saturday Night Live | Various Characters | "Host: Lin-Manuel Miranda" | NBC |
| 2017 (69th) | Matthew Rhys | Girls | Chuck Palmer | "American Bitch" | HBO |
2018 (70th)
| 2018 (70th) | Katt Williams | Atlanta | Uncle Willie | "Alligator Man" | FX |
| 2018 (70th) | Sterling K. Brown | Brooklyn Nine-Nine | Philip Davidson | "The Box (Brooklyn Nine-Nine)" | Fox |
| 2018 (70th) | Bryan Cranston | Curb Your Enthusiasm | Dr. Lionel Templeton | "Running with the Bulls" | HBO |
| 2018 (70th) | Donald Glover | Saturday Night Live | Various Characters | "Host: Donald Glover" | NBC |
| 2018 (70th) | Bill Hader | Saturday Night Live | Various Characters | "Host: Bill Hader" | NBC |
| 2018 (70th) | Lin-Manuel Miranda | Curb Your Enthusiasm | Lin-Manuel Miranda | "Fatwa!" | HBO |
2019 (71st)
| 2019 (71st) | Luke Kirby | The Marvelous Mrs. Maisel | Lenny Bruce | "All Alone" | Amazon |
| 2019 (71st) | Matt Damon | Saturday Night Live | Brett Kavanaugh / Various roles | "Host: Matt Damon" | NBC |
| 2019 (71st) | Robert De Niro | Saturday Night Live | Robert Mueller | "Host: Sandra Oh" | NBC |
| 2019 (71st) | Peter MacNicol | Veep | Jeff Kane | "Oslo" | HBO |
| 2019 (71st) | John Mulaney | Saturday Night Live | Various Characters | "Host: John Mulaney" | NBC |
| 2019 (71st) | Adam Sandler | Saturday Night Live | Various Characters | "Host: Adam Sandler" | NBC |
| 2019 (71st) | Rufus Sewell | The Marvelous Mrs. Maisel | Declan Howell | "Look, She Made a Hat" | Amazon |

=== 2020s ===
| Year | Actor | Program | Role | Episode | Network |
|---|---|---|---|---|---|
2020 (72nd)
| 2020 (72nd) | Eddie Murphy | Saturday Night Live | Various Characters | "Host: Eddie Murphy" | NBC |
| 2020 (72nd) | Adam Driver | Saturday Night Live | Various Characters | "Host: Adam Driver" | NBC |
| 2020 (72nd) | Luke Kirby | The Marvelous Mrs. Maisel | Lenny Bruce | "It's Comedy or Cabbage" | Amazon |
| 2020 (72nd) | Dev Patel | Modern Love | Joshua | "When Cupid Is a Prying Journalist" | Amazon |
| 2020 (72nd) | Brad Pitt | Saturday Night Live | Anthony Fauci | "SNL at Home #2" | NBC |
| 2020 (72nd) | Fred Willard (posthumous) | Modern Family | Frank Dunphy | "Legacy" | ABC |
2021 (73rd)
| 2021 (73rd) | Dave Chappelle | Saturday Night Live | Various Characters | "Host: Dave Chappelle" | NBC |
| 2021 (73rd) | Alec Baldwin | Saturday Night Live | President Donald Trump | "Host: Dave Chappelle" | NBC |
| 2021 (73rd) | Morgan Freeman | The Kominsky Method | Himself | "The Round Toes, Of the High Shoes" | Netflix |
| 2021 (73rd) | Daniel Kaluuya | Saturday Night Live | Various Characters | "Host: Daniel Kaluuya" | NBC |
| 2021 (73rd) | Dan Levy | Saturday Night Live | Various Characters | "Host: Dan Levy" | NBC |
2022 (74th)
| 2022 (74th) | Nathan Lane | Only Murders in the Building | Teddy Dimas | "The Boy from 6B" | Hulu |
| 2022 (74th) | Jerrod Carmichael | Saturday Night Live | Various Characters | "Host: Jerrod Carmichael" | NBC |
| 2022 (74th) | Bill Hader | Curb Your Enthusiasm | Igor/Gregor/Timor | "Igor, Gregor, & Timor" | HBO |
| 2022 (74th) | James Lance | Ted Lasso | Trent Crimm | "Inverting the Pyramid of Success" | Apple TV+ |
| 2022 (74th) | Christopher McDonald | Hacks | Marty Ghilain | "The One, the Only" | HBO Max |
| 2022 (74th) | Sam Richardson | Ted Lasso | Edwin Akufo | "Midnight Train to Royston" | Apple TV+ |
2023 (75th)
| 2023 (75th) | Sam Richardson | Ted Lasso | Edwin Akufo | "International Break" | Apple TV+ |
| 2023 (75th) | Jon Bernthal | The Bear | Michael Berzatto | "Braciole" | FX |
| 2023 (75th) | Luke Kirby | The Marvelous Mrs. Maisel | Lenny Bruce | "Four Minutes" | Prime Video |
| 2023 (75th) | Nathan Lane | Only Murders in the Building | Teddy Dimas | "Here's Looking at You..." | Hulu |
| 2023 (75th) | Pedro Pascal | Saturday Night Live | Various Characters | "Host: Pedro Pascal" | NBC |
| 2023 (75th) | Oliver Platt | The Bear | Jimmy "Cicero" Kalinowski | "Dogs" | FX |
2024 (76th)
| 2024 (76th) | Jon Bernthal | The Bear | Michael Berzatto | "Fishes" | FX |
| 2024 (76th) | Matthew Broderick | Only Murders in the Building | Matthew Broderick | "CoBro" | Hulu |
| 2024 (76th) | Ryan Gosling | Saturday Night Live | Various Characters | "Host: Ryan Gosling" | NBC |
| 2024 (76th) | Christopher Lloyd | Hacks | Larry Arbuckle | "The Deborah Vance Christmas Spectacular" | Max |
| 2024 (76th) | Bob Odenkirk | The Bear | Uncle Lee | "Fishes" | FX |
| 2024 (76th) | Will Poulter | The Bear | Luca | "Honeydew" | FX |
2025 (77th)
| 2025 (77th) | Bryan Cranston | The Studio | Griffin Mill | "CinemaCon" | Apple TV+ |
| 2025 (77th) | Jon Bernthal | The Bear | Michael Berzatto | "Napkins" | FX |
| 2025 (77th) | Dave Franco | The Studio | Himself | "CinemaCon" | Apple TV+ |
| 2025 (77th) | Ron Howard | The Studio | Himself | "The Note" | Apple TV+ |
| 2025 (77th) | Anthony Mackie | The Studio | Himself | "The Note" | Apple TV+ |
| 2025 (77th) | Martin Scorsese | The Studio | Himself | "The Promotion" | Apple TV+ |
2026 (78th)
| 2026 (78th) | Rob Reiner (posthumous) | The Bear | Albert Schnur | "Tonnato" | FX |
| 2026 (78th) | Michael J. Fox | Shrinking | Gerry | "The Field" | Apple TV |
| 2026 (78th) | Brett Goldstein | Shrinking | Louis Winston | "Happiness Mission" | Apple TV |
| 2026 (78th) | Hamish Linklater | Widow's Bay | Richard Warren | "Seasickness" | Apple TV |
| 2026 (78th) | Christopher McDonald | Hacks | Marty Ghilain | "No New Tricks" | HBO Max |
| 2026 (78th) | Connor Storrie | Saturday Night Live | Various Characters | "Host: Connor Storrie" | NBC |

== Individuals with multiple wins ==
3 wins

- Mel Brooks (consecutive)

2 wins

- Dave Chappelle
- Tim Conway
- Jimmy Fallon
- Jay Thomas (consecutive)
- Justin Timberlake

== Programs with multiple awards ==
7 awards

- Saturday Night Live (2 consecutive)

4 awards

- Mad About You (3 consecutive)

3 awards

- Murphy Brown (2 consecutive)
- Will & Grace (2 consecutive)

2 awards

- The Bear
- Frasier (consecutive)
- Monk

== Individuals with multiple nominations ==
7 nominations

- Nathan Lane

5 nominations

- Fred Willard

4 nominations

- Will Arnett
- Mel Brooks
- Jon Hamm

3 nominations

- Alec Baldwin
- Jon Bernthal
- Bobby Cannavale
- Louis C.K.
- John Cleese
- Bill Hader
- Luke Kirby
- Anthony LaPaglia
- Bob Newhart
- Justin Timberlake

2 nominations

- Hank Azaria
- Beau Bridges
- Roscoe Lee Browne
- Steve Buscemi
- Sid Caesar
- Dave Chappelle
- Tim Conway
- Bryan Cranston
- Matt Damon
- Danny DeVito
- David Duchovny
- Herb Edelman
- Jimmy Fallon
- Michael J. Fox
- Victor Garber
- Will Geer
- Christopher McDonald
- Lin-Manuel Miranda
- Brad Pitt
- Carl Reiner
- Sam Richardson
- Martin Sheen
- Jay Thomas
- Bradley Whitford

== Programs with multiple nominations ==
32 nominations

- Saturday Night Live

14 nominations

- 30 Rock

13 nominations

- Frasier

9 nominations

- Will & Grace

8 nominations

- The Golden Girls

7 nominations

- The Bear
- The Cosby Show
- Mad About You
- Murphy Brown

6 nominations

- Friends
- Modern Family

5 nominations

- Curb Your Enthusiasm
- Seinfeld
- The Studio

4 nominations

- The Marvelous Mrs. Maisel
- Veep

3 nominations

- The Big Bang Theory
- Cheers
- Dream On
- Everybody Loves Raymond
- Extras
- Girls
- Hacks
- The Larry Sanders Show
- Nurse Jackie
- Only Murders in the Building
- Ted Lasso

2 nominations

- 3rd Rock from the Sun
- Coach
- Glee
- Life with Bonnie
- Monk
- My Name Is Earl
- Shrinking
- Transparent
- The Wonder Years
