= Game Changer (Modern Family) =

- Modern Family episode
- Mitchell (Jesse Tyler Ferguson) trying to help Claire (Julie Bowen) to buy an iPad for Phil (Ty Burrell)
- Episode no.: Season 1 Episode 19
- Directed by: Kevin Sullivan
- Story by: Vanessa McCarthy; Joe Lawson
- Teleplay by: Joe Lawson; Alex Herschlag
- Production code: 1ARG21
- Original air date: March 31, 2010

Guest appearance
- Jason Antoon as Apple customer

Episode chronology
← Previous "Starry Night"	Next → "Benched"
- Modern Family season 1

"Game Changer" is the nineteenth episode of the first season of Modern Family and the nineteenth episode of the series overall. It premiered on ABC on March 31, 2010. The episode's teleplay was written by Joe Lawson & Alex Herschlag from a story by Vanessa McCarthy & Joe Lawson. It was directed by Kevin Sullivan.

In the episode, it is Phil's birthday and Claire wants to buy him an Apple iPad, excited about buying him a good gift for the first time but she meets some difficulties till she manages to get one. Meanwhile, Mitchell wants to toughen up and Cameron hears a neighbor's marital difficulties over the baby monitor. Cameron tries to help his neighbors not to get a divorce and is pleased when he succeeds. Jay faces off with Manny and Gloria over chess.

"Game Changer" received positive reviews but was criticized for excessively promoting the iPad. The episode received an 18-49 Nielsen Rating of 3.8/7.

== Plot ==
It is April 3 and Phil's birthday coincides with the launch of the new Apple iPad. Being an early adopter and a technophile, Phil wants to wake up early to get in line for the product at the local Apple store. Claire wants him to have a relaxing birthday so she takes it upon herself to wake up early and go buy the product. She does wake up early, but quickly falls back to sleep on the couch; it is not until the family wakes up and is making breakfast that she manages to sneak out of the house to get in line. However, the local store has sold out by the time she gets there, so she returns empty-handed. After being confronted by Phil, she makes it her mission to get one for the rest of the day. Phil decides to go to the batting cages to cool off and mistakenly believes a child's birthday party is for him – only adding to his unhappiness, so he eats a 'Game changer', (a pancake with bacon and golden syrup) to cheer himself up.

Jay has purchased a chess set for Phil. Jay decides to challenge Manny not knowing that Manny is a good player. Gloria, not wanting Jay to be a sore loser, tells Manny to throw the game. When Jay keeps trying to get Manny to try a child's version of chess, Manny is insulted and challenges Jay to a rematch. Manny states that if he wins, he gets Jay's watch and beats Jay in four moves. Gloria tells Jay she is also an excellent player but lets Jay think he is better. Jay – believing he is winning – decides to call the game because he does not want an unhappy wife while Gloria reveals that she would have beaten him in two moves. She says to the camera "I'm an excellent chess player, but a better wife".

The night before Phil's birthday, Cameron and Mitchell hear a man's voice coming from Lily's room. They believe that it might be a burglar. They then discover that there was no burglar; just a signal accidentally received from a neighboring house by the baby monitor. The next day, Mitchell asks Jay to help him toughen up so that if it actually happens in the future, he can take more appropriate action while Cameron keeps listening to conversations from the baby monitor. He discovers that a misunderstanding may cause a divorce and decides to tell the wife the truth before anything bad happens.

Meanwhile, Claire comes home without an iPad. However, Luke manages to convince a man online that his father was dying and his last wish was an iPad – so the man brought a second iPad over and gave it to Luke to give to Phil. That night, during the party, she brings out the iPad to a delighted Phil.

In the end, Mitchell and Cameron listen to the couple talk about how Cameron must be an angel, but Cameron quickly turns it off when the couple realizes that he may have been a creepy pervert.

== Production ==
The episode was written by Joe Lawson & Alex Herschlag, Joe Lawson's third writing credit and Alex's first writing credit. It was directed by Kevin Sullivan.

The episode includes guest stars Kevin Fry-Bowers as the security guard at the Apple Store, Jason Antoon as Clark, Whitney Claire Kaufman as Sarah, Tyrel Jackson Williams as Little Phil, Harrison White as the postman and Zak Boggan as the kid outside the batting cage. Although the iPad was prominently featured, Apple Inc. did not pay for product placement within this episode.

== Reception ==
=== Ratings ===
In its original American broadcast, "Game Changer" came second in its timeslot after American Idol being viewed by 9.51 million viewers and an 18-49 Nielsen Rating of 3.8 rating and an 11% share beating last week's 3.7. The show was the 4th most viewed show of the night. The episode ranked 20 in the weekly viewership ranking sixth for ABC and ranked 8 in the 18-49 Nielsen Rating ranking 3rd on ABC in the rating.

=== Reviews ===
The episode received positive reviews.

Robert Canning of IGN gave the episode an 8 saying it was "impressive" and "though "Game Changer" lacked creativity when it came to storylines, the likeability of these characters kept the tone fun and made the episode enjoyable."

Lesley Savage of Entertainment Weekly gave the episode positive review saying: "It’s the little things that make this show so clever.".

Donna Bowman from The A.V. Club gave the episode an A−, saying "Even though there were funny moments in the other two stories, Phil's journey from excitement to near-catatonic resignation ("honey, it's okay, I don't feel things anymore," he reassures Claire) to euphoric rebirth was brilliantly played"

Joel Keller of The TV Squad criticized the episode for product placement of the iPad saying "Look, I'm not an Apple hater; I love my iPod Touch, and one day I may convert from being a PC guy to a Mac guy. But this company has enough buzz from tech media types who get the vapors every time Jobs dons his black mock turtleneck to introduce a new product, and it's not like they don't already have a monstrous advertising budget. Do they really need to infect our favorite shows, too?"
