= The Incident (Modern Family) =

- Modern Family episode
- Episode no.: Season 1 Episode 4
- Directed by: Jason Winer
- Written by: Steven Levitan
- Cinematography by: Jim Bagdonas
- Editing by: Ryan Case
- Production code: 1ARG05
- Original air date: October 14, 2009

Guest appearances
- Shelley Long as DeDe Pritchett; Reid Ewing as Dylan

Episode chronology
← Previous "Come Fly with Me"	Next → "Coal Digger"
- Modern Family season 1

"The Incident" is the fourth episode of the American family sitcom television series Modern Family. It premiered on ABC in the United States on October 14, 2009. The episode was written by co-creator and executive producer of Modern Family, Steven Levitan and directed by series main director, Jason Winer.

In the episode, Mitchell and Claire's mother visits the family months after she embarrassed Jay in front of his family on his wedding day. Phil and Claire try to judge whether Haley's boyfriend is acceptable to take her to a concert or not. Mitchell goes to his father's house to tell him that they are inviting his ex-wife to a party, but he does not tell Gloria. At the reunion, Gloria and Jay's ex-wife begin to fight, but Haley's boyfriend stops them.

"The Incident" received positive reviews from the television critics and received a 3.6/10 in the 18-49 demographic according to Nielsen Media Research.

== Plot ==
DeDe (Shelley Long), Claire (Julie Bowen) and Mitchell's (Jesse Tyler Ferguson) mother as well as the ex-wife of Jay (Ed O'Neill), stops in for a surprise visit. She states that she wants to try to make up with everyone that she offended during an incident that she had caused at Jay and Gloria's (Sofía Vergara) wedding. DeDe had become progressively drunk during the event, culminating in a drunken speech mocking Gloria, and was carried out, knocking over the wedding cake in the process. In the present, Haley (Sarah Hyland) attempts to convince her parents to let her go to a concert with her boyfriend, Dylan (Reid Ewing), but Claire and Phil (Ty Burrell) refuse to let her go.

At Gloria and Jay's house, Gloria's 11-year-old son Manny (Rico Rodriguez) has come home from a sleepover, where he was the victim of a prank. Gloria promises to help Manny get revenge, which he does by setting a kid's bicycle on fire. DeDe persuades Mitchell to tell the family about her visit for her, while Mitchell's boyfriend Cameron (Eric Stonestreet) looks on with concern. Mitchell tells Jay about DeDe first, but Jay stops him from telling Gloria.

Later, the whole family (as well as Dylan) meets at Claire's house for dinner. DeDe arrives (much to the shock and chagrin of Gloria) and gives her apology. Gloria forgives her, which angers DeDe, prompting her to attack Gloria. The fight is broken up by Dylan, who reminds them to be thankful that they are such a close-knit family, and starts serenading Haley with a song he wrote. Phil and Claire are impressed by his sensibility, initially agreeing to let him and Haley go to the concert. However, Dylan's serenade quickly becomes sexual, causing them to change their minds.

In the ending scene, it is shown that the family members enjoyed Dylan's song, singing it while they get prepared for the day.

== Production ==
The episode was written by Steven Levitan and directed by Jason Winer. The episode is Steven Levitan's third writing credit after the pilot episode and "The Bicycle Thief". The episode is also Jason Winer's fourth directors credit after the pilot episode, "The Bicycle Thief" and "Come Fly with Me". It is also Shelley Long's first guest appearance on the show as Jay's ex-wife and Mitchell & Claire's mother, DeDe Pritchett.

== Reception ==
=== Ratings ===
In its original American broadcast, "The Incident" was viewed by an estimated 9.353 million households and a 5.8 rating/9% share Nielsen rating receiving a 3.6 rating/10% share in the 18-49 demographic coming second in its timeslot after Criminal Minds.

=== Reviews ===
"The Incident" was widely acclaimed by television critics. BuddyTV named this episode the 33rd best episode of 2009 saying "The matriarch of the family returned to cause trouble, but what sealed the deal on this episode's greatness was Dylan's performance of his catchy but wildly inappropriate song "In the Moonlight". Robert Canning of IGN gave the episode a 9.0/10 saying it was "Outstanding" and ""The Incident" was a great episode with a far more personal storyline than generically learning responsibility with a new bike." referring to "The Bicycle Thief," the second episode of the first season"

Jason Hughes of TV Squad gave the episode a positive review and praised the casting of Shelley Long saying, "She hasn't lost even a bit of her comic chops, either. I'm hoping she agreed to come back and play this role over and over again."

Donna Bowman of The A.V. Club gave the episode an A saying, "Last week I wrote that Modern Family's sense of sky's-the-limit potential arises ‘not because it's starting from somewhere and going somewhere else--but because it's got so much territory to explore right where it's plopped itself down.’ And this week it's like they've set out to prove me right."

Michael Slezak of Entertainment Weekly remarked that, "Just when you think Modern Family can’t get any funnier, it does. And I say that both about the series generally and last night’s episode specifically."

James Poniewozik of Time stated, "With the arrival of Mom (Shelley Long) providing the excuse (of Claire and Mitchell acting as brother and sister), this episode added some layers to their family dynamic (though we had already heard that Claire had been a rebellious daughter)."

Many critics have praised the casting of Shelley Long as DeDe. Michael Slezak said, "The casting of Shelley Long as Jay’s passive-aggressive (except when violently aggressive) yet sexually reactivated ex-wife was a stroke of genius." Robert Canning said, "Long was a great choice for this sweet but aggravating character that could be as free-spirited as she was mean."
