= Run for Your Wife (Modern Family) =

- Modern Family episode
- Cam (Eric Stonestreet) and Mitchell (Jesse Tyler Ferguson) with Lily at the doctor's office
- Episode no.: Season 1 Episode 6
- Directed by: Jason Winer
- Written by: Brad Walsh; Paul Corrigan
- Production code: 1ARG01
- Original air date: October 28, 2009

Guest appearance
- Suzy Nakamura as Dr. Miura

Episode chronology
← Previous "Coal Digger"	Next → "En Garde"
- Modern Family season 1

"Run for Your Wife" is the sixth episode of the American family sitcom television series Modern Family. It premiered on ABC in the United States on October 28, 2009. The episode was written by Brad Walsh & Paul Corrigan and directed by Jason Winer.

In the episode, it is the first day back to school for the kids, and, at the Dunphy house, Phil oversteps when he misreads how Claire is coping with an empty nest. Over at Jay's, he and Gloria are in disagreement over Manny's interesting choice of outfit for his first day of class. Mitchell and Cameron freak out after Lily gets her first bump on the head.

"Run for Your Wife" received positive reviews from the critics and became the highest rated scripted program of the night.

On the DVD release in the U.S. and the U.K., this episode is restored to its production order as the second episode of the series.

== Plot ==
It is the first day of school, and the episode opens with a mass chaos in the Dunphy household. Luke (Nolan Gould) was supposed to keep a summer journal, but he only wrote one entry: June 21, found a stick. Haley (Sarah Hyland) just got her learner's permit, and is embarrassed that the driving instructor will be picking her up from school. She does not want her friends to think that she is dating a 40-year-old man.

With all of the kids out of the house, Phil (Ty Burrell) misreads how Claire (Julie Bowen) is dealing with the empty house, believing she is bored and needs a challenge. In reality, Claire just wants to sit in the house alone and read her book, but Phil challenges her to a running race, believing he is faster than she is. At the end of their race, Claire gives up and lets Phil win, knowing that the kids leaving for school was harder on him than it was on her and he needed the win more than she did. While celebrating, Haley hits Phil with the Driver's Ed car.

Gloria (Sofía Vergara) cannot believe that Manny (Rico Rodriguez) is going into 5th grade. Manny wants to show his classmates that he is proud of his Colombian heritage and wears a Colombian poncho on his first day of school. Jay (Ed O'Neill) and Gloria have a disagreement over Manny's decision because Jay thinks he will get beat up because of it. Gloria believes that Jay is overreacting and consequently undermining Manny's confidence. Jay agrees with her but secretly, takes Manny's poncho before dropping him off at school. Gloria finds the poncho in the trunk of the car and gets mad, making Jay drive back to school to return it to Manny. Jay gives the poncho back to Manny, while Manny informs them that he will be playing the traditional Colombian pan flute, and doing the dance too as he plays it. Hearing that, Gloria asks Jay to break the flute because the combination of the poncho, the flute and the dance is more than she can handle. Jay "accidentally" stomps on the flute breaking it.

Mitchell (Jesse Tyler Ferguson) is frantically baby proofing the house so Lily will not get hurt. Cameron (Eric Stonestreet) has Lily dressed up as various pop icons to do a photo shoot with her. Cameron thinks that Mitchell needs to lighten up and just dance with Lily but while dancing, Mitchell accidentally hits her head on the wall. After a quick discussion with Claire on the phone, they decide to take Lily to the doctor. Dr. Miura (Suzy Nakamura) happens to be Asian, like Lily. They tell Dr. Miura that they plan on raising Lily in her Asian heritage. Cameron asks if he pronounced the name of an Asian soup correctly, but Dr. Miura is from Denver and takes offense about it. Leaving the doctor's office, Mitchell doubts his abilities as a father and while arguing with Cameron about it, they accidentally lock Lily in the car.

At the end of the episode, all of the families reflect on how difficult it is to be a parent, but despite all of the trials, it is the best job in the world.

== Production ==
The episode was written by Brad Walsh and Paul Corrigan, their first writing credit for the show. The episode originally aired October 28, 2009 on American Broadcasting Company as the sixth episode of the series and first season. Despite this, it is placed second on the first season DVD. The prior episode Coal Digger takes place during the school year despite this episode being the first day of school.

The episode also guest stars Suzy Nakamura as Dr. Miura and would later appear in "Fears". Cameron and Mitchell's reaction to Lily being locked in the car was improvised by the actors who play them, Eric Stonestreet and Jesse Tyler Ferguson.

== Reception ==
=== Ratings ===
In its original American broadcast, "Run for Your Wife" was viewed by an estimated 9.325 million households and a 5.5 rating/8% share Nielsen rating and a 3.7 rating/9% share in the 18–49 demographic.

=== Reviews ===
The episode has received positive reviews from critics.

IGN reviewer Robert Canning gave the episode an 8.9 calling it "Great" and also stated "Even though the series can get hilariously loopy, this subtleness keeps it all grounded and real… and very, very funny.

Jason Hughes of TV Squad said "Once again, the three families on this show needn't interact at all for the series to work".

James Poniewozik of Time called it "another fine one" and called it a "fine outing for Sofia Vergara".

Donna Bowman of The A.V. Club gave the episode a B− saying "It's just a mediocre episode, and I actually thought it showed just as much heart as I've come to expect from the show. The formula just got tweaked in ways that didn't turn out to be so fruitful".

Wendy Mitchell of Entertainment Weekly stated in her review "As with every week, I feel like there are so many that I could just cut and paste the entire script", referring to the number of "hilarious lines" in the episode.
