= The Bicycle Thief (disambiguation) =

The Bicycle Thief or Bicycle Thieves may refer to:

- The Bicycle Thief (band), American alternative rock band
- "The Bicycle Thief" (Modern Family), episode of the television series Modern Family
- Bicycle Thieves, also known as The Bicycle Thief, 1948 film directed by Vittorio De Sica
- Bicycle Thieves (2013 film), Indian Malayalam film

== See also ==
- Bicycle theft
