= Down in the Hole =

Down in the Hole may refer to:

- "Down in the Hole", a song by Bruce Springsteen from his 2014 album High Hopes
- "Down in the Hole", a song by James Taylor from his 1991 album New Moon Shine
- "Down in the Hole", a song by The Rolling Stones from their 1980 album Emotional Rescue

== See also ==
- "Down in a Hole", a song by Alice in Chains from their 1992 album Dirt
- Down in a Hole (album), a 2016 album by actor Kiefer Sutherland
- "Way Down in the Hole", a song by Tom Waits from his 1987 album Franks Wild Years, also used as the theme song for the TV series The Wire
