= Cindy Vela =

American actress

- Born: Brownsville, Texas, U.S.
- Education: University of Texas at Brownsville and Texas Southmost College (B.A.)
- Occupations: Actress, model
- Years active: 2000–present
- Partner(s): Kiefer Sutherland (2014–present; engaged)
- Website: cindyvela.com

Cindy Vela is an American actress and model. She appeared in Black November (2012), Endgame (2015), Camino (2016), and Run Hide Fight (2020).

== Early life and education ==
Vela was born in Brownsville, Texas. She later lived in Olmito. Vela is the daughter of Lupita and Fred Vela. She has a brother named Freddy Vela. She graduated from Los Fresnos High School. Vela attended the University of Texas at Brownsville and Texas Southmost College, where she was the lead saxophonist in the jazz band and concert band. She later received a bachelor of arts degree in music education.

She became a band director at Memorial Middle School and briefly directed the band at Harlingen High School. In 2000, she won the title of Miss Latina. A photographer discovered her while she was in college and Vela moved to Los Angeles to pursue acting and modeling.

== Career ==
Vela has played supporting roles in Mexican-American productions including Harvest of Redemption (2007), Desdemona: A Love Story (2009), and Thou Shalt Not Kill (2014). Vela's first appearance is in 2005 drama Puños rosas, in an uncredited role. In a 2009 film Ready or Not, she played one of Alex Rocco's mistress. She was praised for her role in Desdemona: A Love Story (2009), which won best feature film at the Boston Film Festival. Vela appeared in a music video for Kris Allen's "The Truth" in 2010. She had previously been in videos for Carlos Santana, Christina Aguilera, and Daddy Yankee.

In 2012, she appeared in Black November, as agent Consuelos. She appeared as a TV reporter in a 2016 film Camino starring Zoë Bell. Vela appeared in the film It's Gawd (2017) as Lucy. One of Ray Bradbury final plays he produced, The Wonderful Ice Cream Suite, featured Vela. Vela appears in the film Run Hide Fight distributed by The Daily Wire and released in 2020 as the character Ms. Nunez, a Spanish teacher caught in the midst of a school shooting.

=== Exhibit B5 ===
Vela appeared in the short film Exhibit-B5 directed by Kyle Rankin and co-starring Corin Nemec and Mircea Monroe. In the film Vela is shown being hit by a car after being "pranked" by her roommate. The film was shared widely on social media as being real. The video was covered by MSNBC Caught on Camera, for which Vela gave an interview. In an interview with Herald de Paris, Vela states that she realised the impact of Exhibit B-5 when she began to be asked for interviews from foreign media outlets.

=== Modeling career ===
Vela has taken part in several modeling campaigns. She appeared on boxes of Special K in Mexico, Colombia and Puerto Rico. She was handpicked for the campaign by designer Ximena Valero.

She appeared in campaigns for Motorola, OPI Products and Wells Fargo. She was a cover girl for Bella Petite and L'Estilo magazine.

== Personal life ==
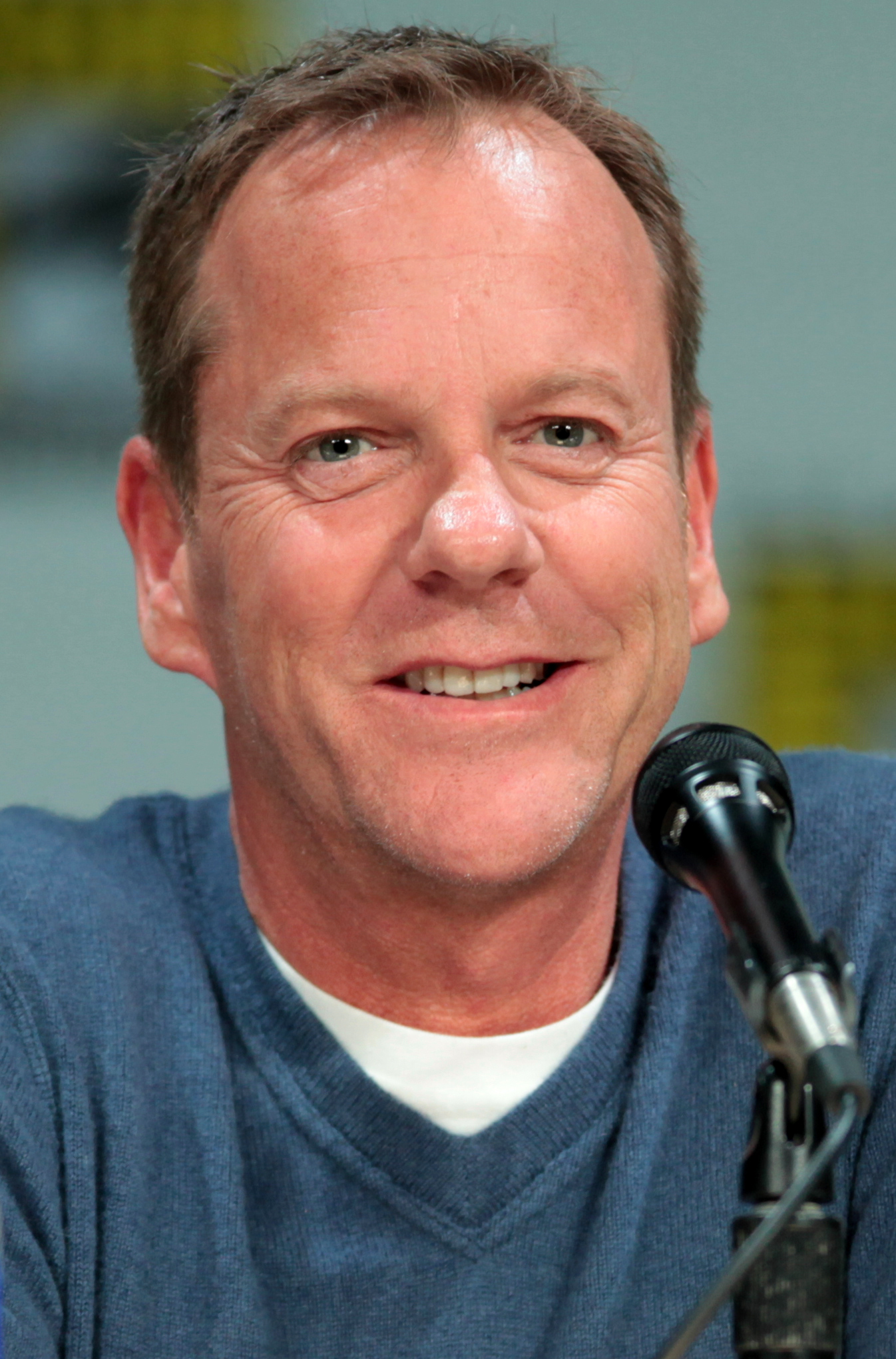
Kiefer Sutherland in 2014

Vela is a trained saxophonist. Vela began dating actor Kiefer Sutherland in 2014. They kept their relationship private up until 2017. Vela toured with Sutherland and his band to promote his album Down in a Hole. Vela and Sutherland became engaged in 2017. As of 2019, Vela resides in Toluca Lake, Los Angeles, with Sutherland.

== Filmography ==
| Year | Title | Role | Note |
|---|---|---|---|
| 2005 | Puños Rosas | La Gritona | |
| 2006 | Hollywood Familia | Teen francesca | |
| 2007 | Harvest of Redemption | Troquero's Daughter | |
| 2009 | Ready or Not | Don Julio's Girl | |
| 2009 | Desdemona: A Love Story | Desdemona | Lead actress |
| 2010 | Exhibit B-5 | Rachel | Viral video |
| 2010 | Boyle Heights | Girl cop | Short film |
| 2012 | La Chamba | Pregnant Chola | TV series, 5 episodes |
| 2012 | Black November | Agent Consuelos | |
| 2012 | Nuclear Family | Karen | TV movie |
| 2012 | The Polterguys | Mindy | |
| 2014 | News Burrito | Cindy | |
| 2014 | Alma | Becky | Short film |
| 2014 | Thou Shalt Not Kill | Gabby Pensiero | |
| 2015 | Endgame | Detention Teacher | |
| 2016 | Camino | TV Reporter | |
| 2017 | It's Gawd! | Lucy | |
| 2020 | Run Hide Fight | Ms. Nunez | |
| 2024 | Oak | Detective Somers | |
