= Calling Out Your Name =

Calling Out Your Name may refer to:

- "Calling Out Your Name", a 1992 song by Rich Mullins from The World as Best as I Remember It
- "Calling Out Your Name", a 2010 song by James Blunt from Some Kind of Trouble
- "Calling Out Your Name", a 1994 song by Jimmy Nail from Crocodile Shoes
- "Calling Out Your Name", a 2016 song by Kiefer Sutherland from Down in a Hole
