= Coal Digger =

- Modern Family episode
- Episode no.: Season 1 Episode 5
- Directed by: Jason Winer
- Written by: Christopher Lloyd
- Cinematography by: Jim Bagdonas
- Editing by: Ryan Case
- Production code: 1ARG03
- Original air date: October 21, 2009

Guest appearance
- Andrew Borba as Mr. Balaban

Episode chronology
← Previous "The Incident"	Next → "Run for Your Wife"
- Modern Family season 1

"Coal Digger" is the fifth episode of the American family sitcom television series Modern Family. It premiered on ABC in the United States on October 21, 2009. The episode was written by co-creator and executive producer of Modern Family, Christopher Lloyd and directed by Jason Winer.

In the episode, the whole family gathers at Jay and Gloria's to watch the football game. Mitch, who does not know much about football, decides to learn some things about it so he can enjoy the game. Luke and Manny make up after fighting at school, but when Manny says that Luke calls Gloria a "coal digger" (a term he has heard from Claire), things get worse, with Gloria leaving the room. Eventually, Claire apologizes and the two women make up.

"Coal Digger" received positive reviews from critics and was named in the top 100 best television episodes of 2009 by BuddyTV. It received a 3.4/9 in the 18-49 demographic according to Nielsen Media Research.

== Plot ==
The whole family is invited for a barbecue and to watch football at Gloria (Sofía Vergara) and Jay's (Ed O'Neill) house. There is an incident between Manny (Rico Rodriguez) and Luke (Nolan Gould) after Manny called Luke his nephew at school, making things very awkward for Claire (Julie Bowen) and Gloria.

Cameron (Eric Stonestreet) is a former college football player and is comfortable with Jay's attitude towards the game. On the other side, Mitchell (Jesse Tyler Ferguson) does not care about football but in order to be more comfortable, he decides to learn more about the game and the two teams so he can try to enjoy the evening along with his dad. His attempt to do so fails miserably when he regularly misuses football terms.

After the family gathers at Jay's house, Phil (Ty Burrell) and Jay talk to Luke and Manny, in order to have them settle their differences. Phil begins to explain the situation, but Jay takes over and simply tells the boys that they are family, and instead of fighting, they should love each other. The boys then go outside and play. While they are outside, Phil convinces Gloria and Claire to address their annoyances with each other.

Later, when the two boys have had some fun, Manny brings up that Luke constantly insults Gloria, calling her a "coal digger". Phil corrects Luke's pronunciation saying he meant "gold digger". Luke states that he learned this term from Claire, who used it last year. This makes the whole situation worse, with Gloria leaving the gathering and staying in her room, refusing to join the group. Phil tries to reason with her, resulting in an awkward situation. Eventually Claire comes to apologize, but Gloria will not accept it unless she can get even. She tells Claire that the only way she can forgive her is to jump into the pool with her clothes on. Claire jumps in and is followed by everyone as they are pushed or jump in, except Haley (Sarah Hyland).

== Production ==
The episode was written by Christopher Lloyd co-creator of Modern Family, making it his second writing credit for the series and first season after the pilot episode. "Coal Digger" was also directed by Jason Winer, his fifth directing credit for the series after directing all previous episodes. The episode, "Coal Digger" originally aired in the United States on October 21, 2009 on American Broadcasting Company as the fifth episode of the series and first season.

Andrew Borba guest starred in the episode as the principal of Luke and Manny's school, Mr. Balaban. Additionally, the episodes were aired in the wrong order; as a result, the episode "Run for Your Wife", which takes place on the first day of school and therefore before "Coal Digger", was not aired until after "Coal Digger".

== Reception ==
=== Ratings ===
In its original American broadcast, "Coal Digger" was viewed in 8.57 million households and got a Nielsen rating of 3.4 rating/9% share in the 18-49 demographic.

=== Reviews ===
The episode received mostly positive reviews from critics.

BuddyTV named "Coal Digger" the 45th best episode of 2009 saying "Gloria and Claire got into a hilarious feud after it's revealed that Claire used to call her young step-mom a gold digger, wrongly interpreted as "coal digger" by her kids."

Robert Canning of IGN gave the episode a 7.7/10 saying it was "Good" and "Coal Digger" proved that even without being packed with hilarity, the young series can still deliver some entertaining television."

James Poniewozik of Time said "Modern Family wasn't as disappointing as last night's Glee, and I found plenty of laughs in it, but all the same it was probably the show's weakest outing."

Donna Bowman of The A.V. Club gave the episode an A− saying "I say that Phil -- whom I've had my doubts about because of his broad cluelessness -- won me over this episode".

Jason Hughes of TV Squad gave the episode a positive review saying "There were so many funny moments in this episode, as there are every episode."

Michael Slezak from Entertainment Weekly gave the episode a positive review. "Of course, as we’ve learned over five glorious episodes, skewering the idiosyncrasies of a very diverse, very real family is what Modern Family does best."
