= Come Fly with Me (Modern Family) =

- Modern Family episode
- Phil (Ty Burrell) after Jay (Ed O'Neill) has "accidentally" crashed his model plane into his nose
- Episode no.: Season 1 Episode 3
- Directed by: Reginald Hudlin
- Written by: Dan O'Shannon
- Cinematography by: Jim Bagdonas
- Editing by: Jonathan Schwartz
- Production code: 1ARG04
- Original air date: October 7, 2009

Guest appearance
- Reid Ewing as Dylan

Episode chronology
← Previous "The Bicycle Thief"	Next → "The Incident"
- Modern Family season 1

"Come Fly with Me" is the third episode of the first season of the ABC sitcom Modern Family and the third episode of the series overall. It originally aired on October 7, 2009. The episode was written by Dan O'Shannon and directed by Reginald Hudlin.

In the episode, Jay tries to spend some time alone with his model airplane, but Phil ruins his plans. He hits Phil in the nose with his model airplane on purpose and claims it was an accident, but later apologizes when Claire calls him on it. Alex and Gloria go to a mall and Gloria tries to convince Alex to wear a dress to a wedding. Mitchell goes to Costco for the first time in his life and while he thinks he will not like it, he gets excited.

"Come Fly with Me" received a 3.4/9 in the 18-49 demographic according to the Nielsen Media Research and positive reviews from television critics with many calling it an improvement over "The Bicycle Thief".

== Plot ==
Jay (Ed O'Neill) pushes Phil (Ty Burrell) to go out with him and fly his new model plane, a Vought F4U Corsair. While Phil gets his moment with Jay, the encounter does not go as he wishes: Jay buzzes Phil with the plane, and as the credits roll, the model plane crashes into Phil's nose. Jay takes Phil back home and claims that he hit him by accident but Claire (Julie Bowen) does not believe him and makes him apologize to Phil.

While Manny (Rico Rodriguez) takes time out to play with Luke (Nolan Gould), Gloria (Sofía Vergara) accompanies Alex (Ariel Winter) in shopping to find a dress for a wedding. Back in the house, Manny ends up having a heart-to-heart talk with his stepsister Claire, while Alex and Gloria talk on like friends (girl friends). Finally, Manny convinces Claire to let Alex be her own way, and Gloria convinces Alex to follow her mother.

Mitchell (Jesse Tyler Ferguson) and Cameron (Eric Stonestreet) go shopping at Costco, but Mitchell feels that he is too good to shop there and he wants to leave. When Cameron introduces him to the wholesale pricing, he gets excited, and the pair end up buying multiple shopping carts of goods, many of which they do not actually need.

In the end of the episode, Gloria reveals to Jay that she used to dress up Manny like a girl when he was a baby because she wanted to have a girl and that when Manny found the pictures, Gloria told him it was his twin sister who had died.

== Reception ==
=== Ratings ===
In its original American broadcast, "Come Fly With Me" was viewed by an estimated 8.823 million households with a 5.4 rating/9% share Nielsen rating and received a 3.4 rating/9% share in the 18-49 demographic going down 4 tenths in the demographic according to the Nielsen Media Research.

=== Reviews ===
"Come Fly with Me" received positive reviews.

Robert Canning of IGN gave the episode an 8.3/10 calling it "Impressive" and stated "Overall, "Come Fly With Me" was proof that this is a series with great potential." and also stated the series has almost everything (heart, comedy, dark comedy).

Jason Hughes of TV Squad gave the episode a positive review saying Jay hitting Phil on purpose "harsh, but funny".

Donna Bowman of The A.V. Club gave the episode an A− saying "Modern Family is shaping up to be one of those rare comedies that actually derives unexpected humor from its premise."

Michael Slezak of Entertainment Weekly stated "While last night’s Modern Family didn’t quite make me double over with laughter the way its first two episodes did, it nonetheless pulled off the trick of effortlessly straddling the territory between absurdist humor and genuinely moving.

TV Fanatic gave the episode a positive reviews saying one of his favorite quotes of the episode was Alex telling Claire "You know, instead of trying to force me to wear a dress, why don't you worry about getting Luke to wear some pants?"

James Poniewozik of Time said "the episode as a whole showed a lot of promise by demonstrating the ways different combinations of the extended family can play off each other"
