= Endgame (2015 film) =

- Film poster
- Directed by: Carmen Marron
- Written by: Carmen Marron; Hector Salinas
- Story by: Hector Salinas
- Produced by: Sandra Avila; Carmen Marron
- Starring: Rico Rodriguez; Justina Machado; Efren Ramirez; Ivonne Coll
- Cinematography: Francisco Bulgarelli
- Edited by: Jamie Cobb; Youssef Delara
- Music by: Brian Standefer
- Production companies: Avila Entertainment; Late Bloomer Productions; Sparkhope Productions
- Distributed by: Shout! Factory
- Release date: April 12, 2015 (Dallas)
- Running time: 90 minutes
- Country: United States
- Language: English

Endgame is a 2015 American biographical drama film starring Rico Rodriguez, Justina Machado, Efren Ramirez and Ivonne Coll. It is based on the true story of real life teacher Jose Juan "J.J." Guajardo.

== Cast ==
- Rico Rodriguez as Jose
- Efren Ramirez as Coach Alvarado
- Justina Machado as Karla
- Jon Gries as Principal Thomas
- Valente Rodriguez as Coach Stevens
- Cassie Brennan as Sandy
- Xavier Gonzalez as Miguel
- Alina Herrera as Dani
- Ivonne Coll as Abuela
- Ivan Cisneros as Peter
- Alesia Orta as Suzie
- Glynn Praesel as Jim Tharpe
- Jon Steven Flores as Checkmate Jacob Stewart
- Daniel Wolfe as Last Year's Champ
- Rodrigo Macouzet as Checkmate Paul
- Noel Rivera as Checkmate Coach
- Cindy Vela as Detention Teacher

== Production ==
The film was shot in Brownsville, Texas.

== Release ==
The film wasn't released in theaters, however, the DVD and Blu-ray sales totaled at $111,100.

== Reception ==
According to the review aggregator website Rotten Tomatoes, 50% of critics have given the film a positive review based on 8 reviews, with an average rating of 6.19/10. Matt Fagerholm of RogerEbert.com awarded the film one and a half stars. Sandie Angulo Chen of Common Sense Media awarded the film three stars out of five. Dann Gire of the Daily Herald awarded the film two stars.
