= Camino (2015 film) =

- Film poster
- Directed by: Josh C. Waller
- Screenplay by: Daniel Noah
- Produced by: Ehud Bleiberg; Daniel Noah; Josh C. Waller
- Starring: Zoë Bell; Nacho Vigalondo; Francisco Barreiro; Sheila Vand; Kevin Pollak
- Cinematography: Noah Greenberg
- Edited by: Brett W. Bachman
- Music by: Kreng
- Production company: Bleiberg Entertainment
- Distributed by: Sabay MVP
- Release dates: 26 September 2015 (Fantastic Fest); 4 March 2016 (United States)
- Running time: 103 minutes
- Country: United States
- Language: English

Camino is a 2015 American action-thriller film directed by Josh C. Waller. It was based on a story created by Daniel Noah and Josh C. Waller. The film stars Zoë Bell as the lead character, along with Nacho Vigalondo, Francisco Barreiro, Sheila Vand and Kevin Pollak in supporting roles. The film was released on 4 March 2016 in the United States.

== Cast ==
- Zoë Bell as Avery Taggert, a photographer
- Nacho Vigalondo as Guillermo, leader of El Guero
- Francisco Barreiro as Tomas
- Sheila Vand as Marianna
- Tenoch Huerta Mejía as Alejo
- Dominic Rains as Daniel
- Kevin Pollak as Daniel
- Jason Canela as Sebastian
- Nancy Gomez as Luna
- Cindy Vela as TV Reporter

== Release ==
The film was released on 4 March 2016 in limited in the United States, and release in DVD in select countries.

== Reception ==
The film critics aggregator Rotten Tomatoes gave the film an approval rating of 27% based on 17 reviews and an average rating of 5.3/10, calling it:"A competent but unmemorable B-movie that eschews any real political content in favor of simple, brutal survival melodrama with scant room for surprises in plot, character or directorial style".
