= Kiefer Sutherland =

British and Canadian actor (born 1966)

- Sutherland in 2026
- Born: Kiefer William Frederick Dempsey George Rufus Sutherland; 21 December 1966 (age 59); London, England
- Citizenship: United Kingdom; Canada
- Occupations: Actor; musician
- Years active: 1983–present
- Spouses: Camelia Kath (m. 1987; div. 1990); Elizabeth Kelly Winn (m. 1996; div. 2004)
- Partner(s): Cindy Vela (2014–present; engaged)
- Children: Sarah Sutherland
- Parents: Donald Sutherland (father); Shirley Douglas (mother)
- Relatives: Angus Sutherland (paternal half-brother); Rossif Sutherland (paternal half-brother); Francine Racette (stepmother); Tommy Douglas (maternal grandfather)
- Website: kiefersutherland.com

Kiefer William Frederick Dempsey George Rufus Sutherland (born 21 December 1966) is a British and Canadian actor. He is best known for his starring role as Jack Bauer in the Fox drama series 24 (2001–2010, 2014), for which he won a Primetime Emmy Award and a Golden Globe Award, and President Tom Kirkman in the ABC political drama series Designated Survivor.

Born to actors Donald Sutherland and Shirley Douglas, he got his first leading film role in the Canadian drama The Bay Boy (1984), which earned him a Genie Award nomination. He has since appeared in such films as Stand by Me (1986), The Lost Boys (1987), Young Guns (1988), Flatliners (1990), A Few Good Men (1992), The Three Musketeers (1993), Freeway (1996), A Time to Kill (1996), Dark City (1998), Phone Booth (2002), Melancholia (2011), Pompeii (2014), The Caine Mutiny Court-Martial (2023) and Father Joe (2026).

He has also starred in the Fox drama Touch (2012–2013), and provided the facial motion capture and voice for Venom Snake and Big Boss in the video games Metal Gear Solid V: Ground Zeroes (2014) and Metal Gear Solid V: The Phantom Pain (2015). Sutherland has been inducted to the Hollywood Walk of Fame and to Canada's Walk of Fame, and has received a Lifetime Achievement Award at the Zurich Film Festival.

== Early life ==
Sutherland was born on 21 December 1966 at St Mary's Hospital in the Paddington district of London, to Donald Sutherland and Shirley Douglas, both successful Canadian actors who had been living and working in England. His parents divorced when he was three. He has a twin sister, Rachel Sutherland, who works as a post-production film supervisor. His maternal grandfather was Scottish-born Canadian politician and former Premier of Saskatchewan Tommy Douglas, who is widely credited for bringing universal health care to Canada.

Sutherland is named after American-born writer and director Warren Kiefer, who directed Donald Sutherland in his first feature film, Castle of the Living Dead. When he was a baby, his mother was arrested by the FBI and charged with conspiracy to possess unregistered explosives but was later exonerated. Sutherland's family moved to Corona, California, in 1968. His parents divorced in 1970. In 1975, Sutherland moved with his mother to Toronto, Ontario. He attended Crescent Town Elementary School and St. Clair Junior High (now Gordon A. Brown Middle School) in East York, and John G. Althouse Middle School in Etobicoke. He attended several high schools, including St. Andrew's College, Martingrove Collegiate Institute, Harbord Collegiate Institute, Silverthorn Collegiate Institute, Malvern Collegiate Institute, and Annex Village Campus. He also spent a semester at Regina Mundi Catholic College in London, Ontario and attended weekend acting lessons at Sir Frederick Banting Secondary School.

Sutherland told The Sunday Times that he rarely saw his father, outside of holidays and summer vacations, until he moved out at age 15. He told Jimmy Kimmel Live! (2009) that he and Robert Downey Jr. were roommates for three years when he first moved to Hollywood to pursue his career in acting. He and Downey also starred together in the film 1969 (1988).

== Career ==
=== 1980s: Rise to fame in Hollywood ===
Sutherland made his screen debut in Max Dugan Returns (as did Matthew Broderick), in which his father Donald Sutherland also starred. Sutherland was one of the contenders for the role of Glen Lantz in the original A Nightmare on Elm Street (1984), which ultimately became Johnny Depp's feature film debut.

After receiving critical acclaim for his role as Donald Campbell in The Bay Boy (1985), Sutherland moved to Hollywood. Stand by Me (1986) was the first film Sutherland made in the United States. In the film, directed by Rob Reiner, he played a neighbourhood bully in a coming-of-age story about a search for a dead body. Before that, he played a silent, supporting character, as one of Sean Penn's friends who goes up against Christopher Walken in James Foley's crime-thriller At Close Range (1986).

He next appeared as a vampire David in Joel Schumacher's The Lost Boys (1987). Promised Land (1988), with Meg Ryan, was the first film to be commissioned by the Sundance Film Festival.

In the Western film Young Guns (1988), he starred alongside Emilio Estevez and Lou Diamond Phillips. He was considered for the role of Robin in Batman (1989), alongside Michael Keaton, in the early production before the character was deleted from the shooting script. He went on to star again with his close friend Lou Diamond Phillips, in the crime-action film Renegades (1989). That same year, he and his father appeared at the 61st Academy Awards as presenters of the Academy Honorary Award to the National Film Board of Canada.

=== 1990s: Success in films ===
In the sequel Young Guns II (1990), Sutherland continued to play 'Doc' alongside some of the original cast and with newcomer Christian Slater. As of 2017, it is the only sequel to a feature film he has starred in. Sutherland starred as the lead in Flatliners (1990), with an ensemble cast featuring Julia Roberts and Kevin Bacon, a film about a student who wants to "experience" death's afterlife and record what happens during it, with the help of a group of young students who are "a little" crazy like him; the film received positive reviews from critics. He plays a young FBI agent coming to terms with his life in a commune in Flashback (1990) alongside Dennis Hopper. Sutherland had also starred in The Nutcracker Prince as Hans/The Nutcracker.

Sutherland did not make a film in 1991. During an interview in March 2012, he said he had declined director Gus Van Sant's offer to star in the lead role in the movie My Own Private Idaho, a decision that he regretted. He was quoted as saying "I passed on My Private Idaho because I wanted to go skiing and didn't even look at it. I told myself that I needed to stick to my plan ... and it was a really dumb plan."

In 1992, he played a doctor alongside Ray Liotta in the drama Article 99. He played a supporting character in Twin Peaks: Fire Walk with Me, the continuation of the short-lived television series of the same name which ran from 1990 to 1991, as agent Sam Stanley; and also in A Few Good Men (1992), where he played a junior officer subordinate to Jack Nicholson's Col. Nathan R. Jessup. The film was nominated for the Academy Award for Best Picture.

In The Vanishing (1993), he starred alongside Jeff Bridges as a desperate man seeking the whereabouts of his girlfriend, three years after she mysteriously vanished. In The Three Musketeers (1993), Sutherland played the central character of Athos.

In 1996, Sutherland appeared in three films. He starred with Reese Witherspoon in Freeway, which gained a cult following. He starred with Sally Field in the thriller Eye for an Eye, and he appeared in A Time to Kill alongside his father Donald Sutherland.

In 1998, he starred in Dark City, the science fiction film directed by Alex Proyas in which he portrayed a character inspired by Daniel P. Schreber. Sutherland also starred in the film Ground Control where he played Jack Harries, an air traffic controller who had a perfect record until one air crash haunts him to leave the business. Years later, he is hurtled back into the world he thought he left behind.

=== 2000s: 24 ===
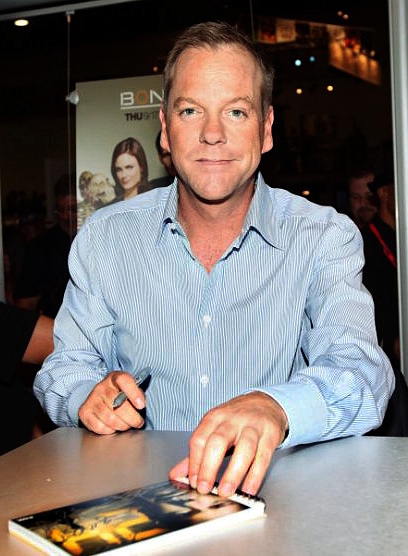
Sutherland in 2009

In 2000, he co-starred with Woody Allen in the black comedy Picking Up the Pieces, but the film was received poorly by both commercial audiences and by critics. Since then, Sutherland has starred in small projects and festival-released films. He starred in the film Beat, which premiered at the Sundance Film Festival in 2000. He also appeared in 2001 film Cowboy Up, which won the Crystal Heart Award at the 2001 Heartland Film Festival. He also starred in the film To End All Wars, which won two awards at the Heartland Film Festival and one award at the Hawaii International Film Festival.

Since 2001, Sutherland has been associated most widely with the role of Jack Bauer on the critically acclaimed television series 24. After being nominated four times for the "Outstanding Lead Actor in a Drama Series" Primetime Emmy Award, Sutherland won the award in 2006 for his role in 24's fifth season. In the opening skit of the 2006 Primetime Emmy Awards, Sutherland made an appearance as his 24 character, Jack Bauer. He was also nominated for Best actor in a Drama Television Series at the 2007 Golden Globe Awards for 24. According to his 2006 contract, his salary of $40 million for three seasons of the show made him the highest-earning actor on television.

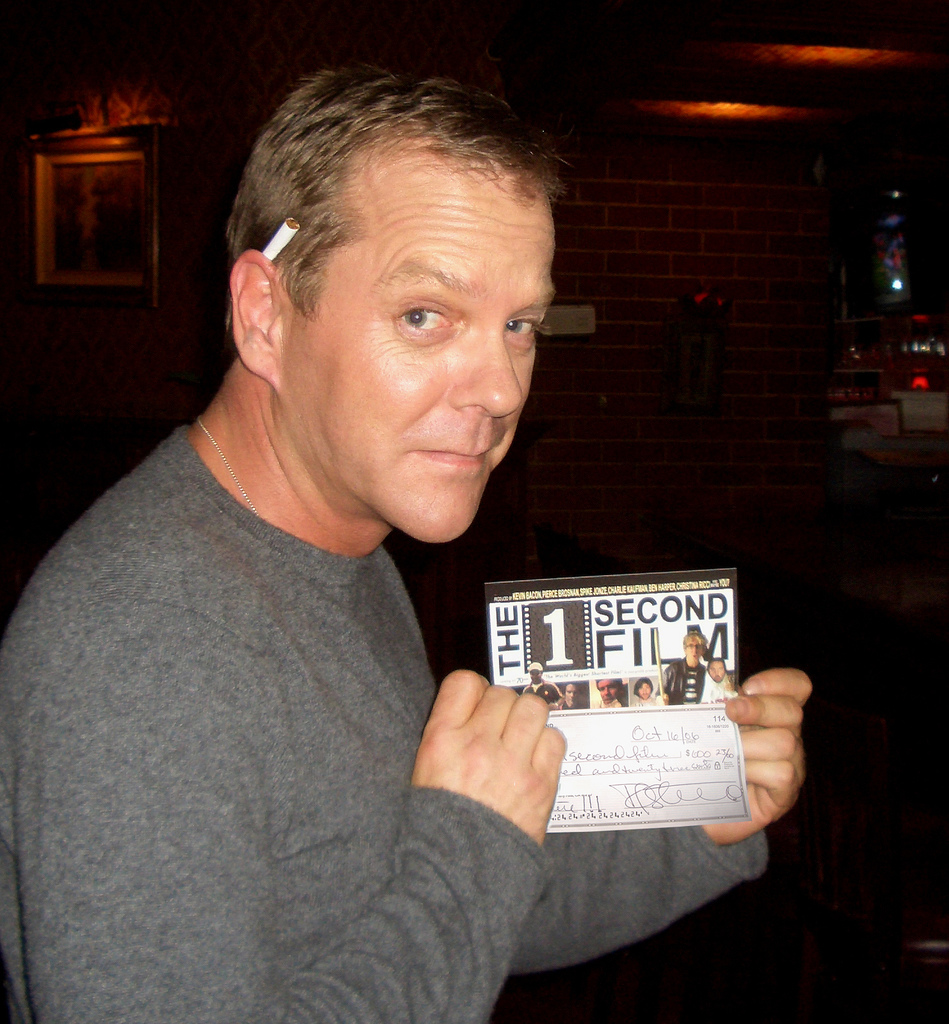
Sutherland holding his cheque for The 1 Second Film, 2006

Sutherland constantly emphasizes that the show is merely "entertainment". The dean of the United States Military Academy, Brigadier General Patrick Finnegan, visited the set of 24 in February 2007 to urge the show's makers to reduce the number of torture scenes and Sutherland accepted an invitation from the U.S. military to tell West Point cadets that it is wrong to torture prisoners. In an interview with OK! magazine, Howard Gordon said it would be an "unbearable loss" if they killed off Sutherland's character.

Due to his extensive schedule with 24, he spent less time in film. In 2004, he starred in Taking Lives, alongside Angelina Jolie and Ethan Hawke, in which he had a "flashy cameo". In The Sentinel (2006), he starred alongside Michael Douglas, as his protégé and he also starred in Disney's The Wild where he voiced the character Samson. He played the lead roles in Alexandre Aja's supernatural horror, Mirrors (2008). In 2009, he joined the DreamWorks animated film Monsters vs. Aliens, reuniting him with actress Reese Witherspoon with whom he starred in Freeway. Monsters vs. Aliens is Sutherland's highest-grossing film to date.

The actor is also a frequent collaborator with director Joel Schumacher, and has appeared in The Lost Boys (1987), Flatliners (1990), Phone Booth (2002), the big screen adaptation of A Time to Kill (1996, the film also starred his father Donald, although their characters did not interact), and Twelve (2010) as the narrator.

In 2005, Sutherland was inducted into Canada's Walk of Fame in Toronto, where both of his parents have also been inducted. He ranked No. 68 on the 2006 Forbes Celebrity 100 list of the world's most powerful celebrities, his earnings were a reported $23 million. In 2008, he was awarded a star on the Hollywood Walk of Fame. Sutherland was the first Inside the Actors Studio guest to be the child of a former guest; his father, Donald, appeared on the show in 1998. Sutherland was featured on the cover of the April 2006 edition of Rolling Stone, in an article entitled "Alone in the Dark with Kiefer Sutherland". The article began with Sutherland revealing his interest to be killed off in 24. However, he stated, "Don't get me wrong. I love what I do." It also revealed that he devoted 10 months a year working on 24. He has starred in Japanese commercials for CalorieMate, performing a parody of his Jack Bauer character. Sutherland also provides voice-overs for the current ad campaign for the Ford Motor Company of Canada. In mid-2006, he voiced the Apple, Inc. advertisement announcing the inclusion of Intel chips in their Macintosh computer line. He also voices the introduction to NHL games on the Versus network in the US.

=== 2010s and 2020s: Post-24 film, television, and music projects ===
On 14 February 2010, Fox TV announced they were temporarily suspending production of Season 8 of 24 due to a ruptured cyst near one of Sutherland's kidneys. According to the report, he waited a few days before going in to have "elective surgery" performed. It was anticipated that he would return after a week, but a few days further were needed and Fox reported that his return to set would be 1 March.

In the 2011 drama-thriller Melancholia directed by Lars Von Trier, he played the male lead character and got the chance to share the screen with long-lost co-stars such as Charlotte Rampling and John Hurt, the film in which Kiefer was nominated for the major Danish film prize Bodil. Kiefer also shared the screen with Hurt another time, this time on the small screen, in the web series The Confession. Sutherland made his Broadway debut, opposite Brian Cox, Jim Gaffigan, Chris Noth and Jason Patric, in the Broadway revival of That Championship Season, which opened in March 2011.

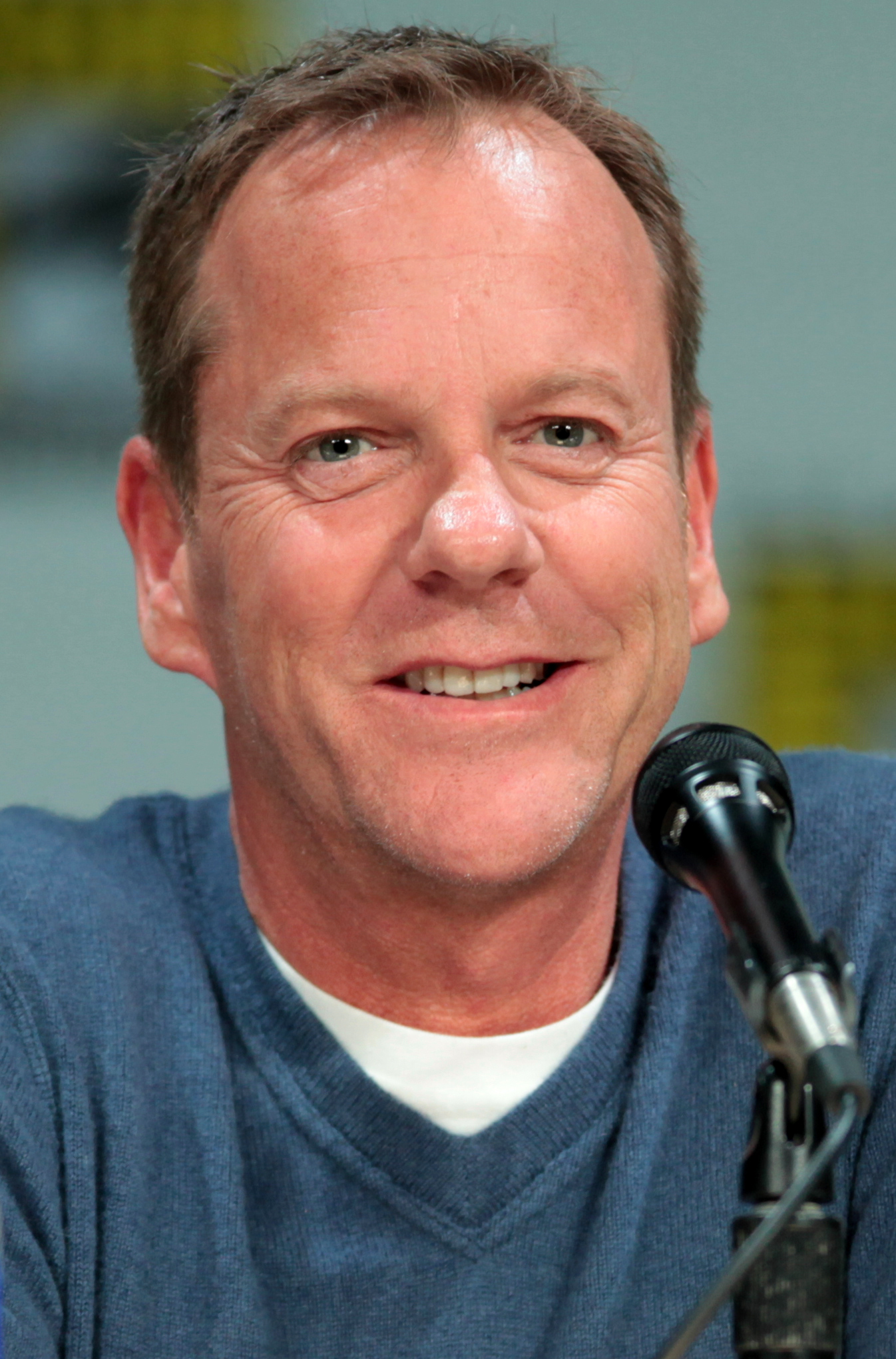
Sutherland in 2014

In 2012, Sutherland starred in the Fox television series Touch. He played the father of an autistic boy who does not like to be touched, while the son also communicates future humanity interrelated events to his father through numbers and mathematics.

In The Reluctant Fundamentalist (2013), the best-selling novel adaptation directed by Mira Nair, he played a supporting character for newcomer Riz Ahmed, as a boss named Jim Cross. On 14 May 2013, it was confirmed that the show 24 would return for a limited series. Before that, he was also offered the lead role in the NBC drama The Blacklist. In May and July 2014, Fox aired the twelve-episode 24: Live Another Day, which received acclaimed reviews from critics. Although he did not appear in 2017's 24: Legacy, he was the show's executive producer.

Sutherland was cast in the 2014 epic romantic historical disaster movie, Pompeii, directed by Paul W. S. Anderson; though the film received generally mixed to negative reviews, and Sutherland's Roman accent and antagonistic performance as Senator Quintus Attius Corvus received polarizing responses from critics, he regarded the film as "much more fun" than many of his other roles, and considered production of the film to be "one of the most comfortable environments I've ever been in".

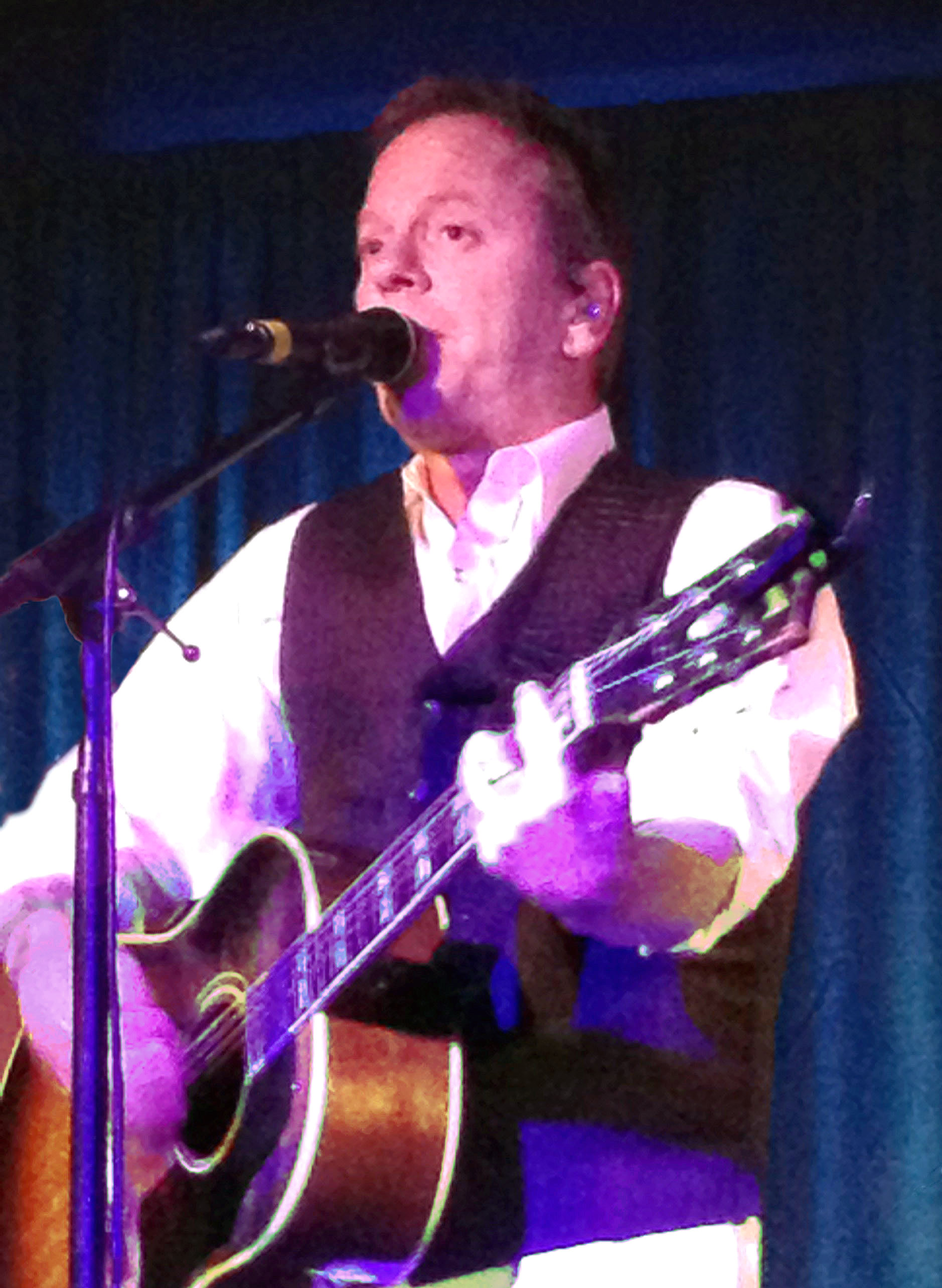
Sutherland playing guitar in concert, 2016

Sutherland also provided narration for several promotional spots for the United States Men's National Soccer Team during the 2014 FIFA World Cup for ESPN. He has appeared in a Brazilian TV commercials for Citroën C4 sedan and a voice-over for a commercial for Bank of America. He voices Sgt. Roebuck in Treyarch's video game Call of Duty: World at War and voices Big Boss in the video game Metal Gear Solid V: Ground Zeroes and its sequel Metal Gear Solid V: The Phantom Pain, taking over the role originally performed by David Hayter.

After working in the movie industry for more than 30 years, he had the chance to star with his father, Donald Sutherland, in the 2015 western-drama film Forsaken, which also stars Demi Moore and Brian Cox. The film screened at the Toronto International Film Festival and received mixed reviews from critics.

In 2016, Sutherland was cast in the lead role of the former ABC political drama series Designated Survivor as Tom Kirkman, the President of the United States. The show was renewed by Netflix for a third season which was released on 7 June 2019.

In 2016, Sutherland released his first album, Down in a Hole, and a music video for "Not Enough Whiskey" from the album. The country music songs were written by Sutherland and Jude Cole. The Kiefer Sutherland Band toured in April and May of that year, and debuted at the Grand Ole Opry on 6 June 2016. A 2017 review in The Guardian said, "you have the first Hollywood hobby act unshackled by convention and with a real shot at greatness." The band performed in Scotland and in Las Vegas in 2019. The band's second album, Reckless and Me, was released in April 2019.

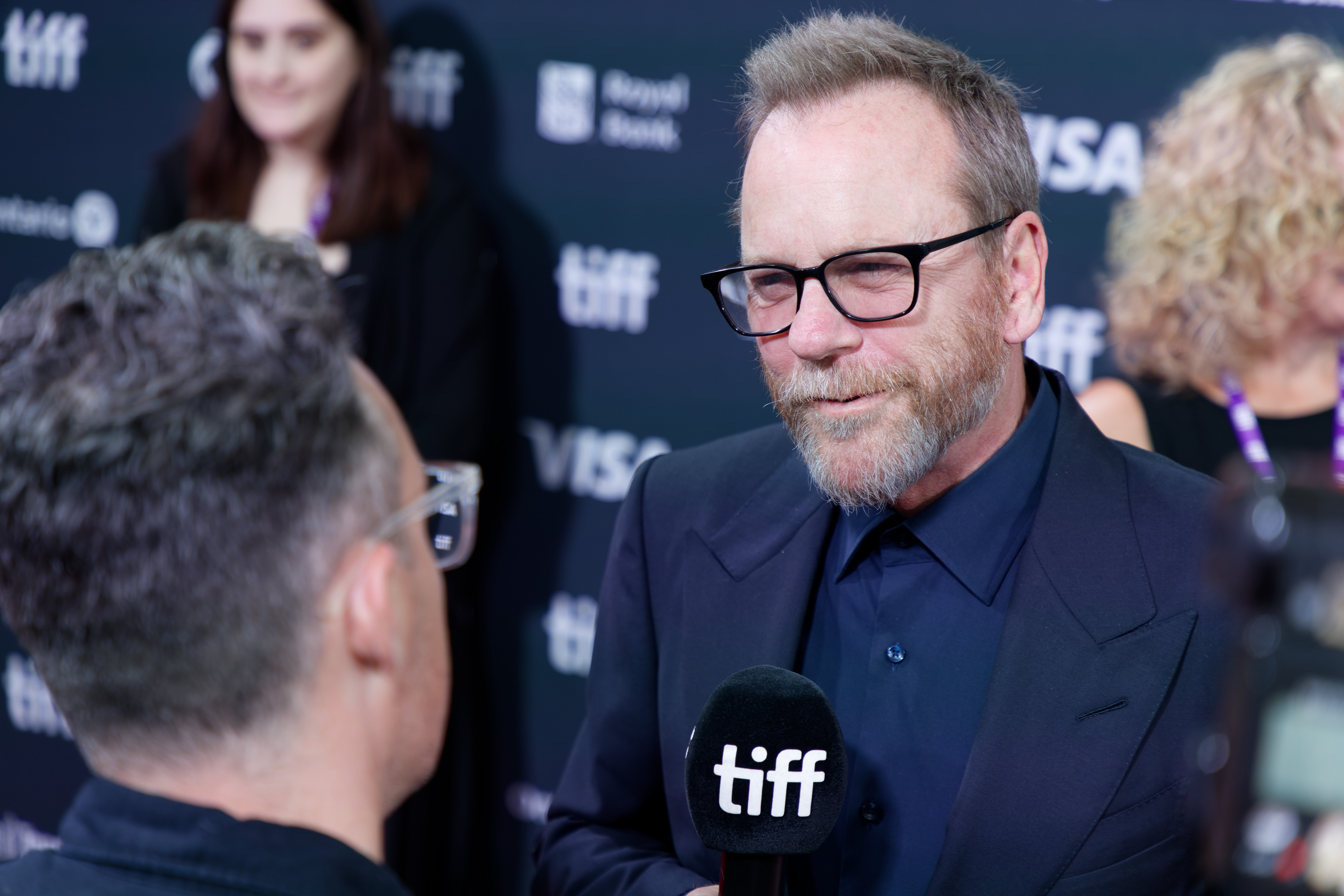
Sutherland being interviewed at the 2024 Toronto International Film Festival

Sutherland played Det. Clay Bryce in the American action thriller television series The Fugitive, which premiered on 3 August 2020. He also starred as lead role John Weir in the 2023 Paramount+ thriller show Rabbit Hole. In the 2023 film The Caine Mutiny Court-Martial, based on the two-act play of the same name, Sutherland played the role of Lieutenant Commander Phillip Queeg, the part portrayed by Humphrey Bogart in the 1954 film adaptation. The Caine Mutiny Court-Martial, directed by William Friedkin, premiered in September 2023 at the 80th Venice International Film Festival where it screened out of competition. The film is Friedkin's sole posthumous work, the director having died on August 7 of the same year. Brian Tallerico of RogerEbert.com praised Sutherland for bringing "unique energy" to the role, describing his performance as "one of the best acting turns of his career." Total Film have also praised his performance, writing Sutherland delivers "some of the best work of his career here. He's only briefly in the film, and yet he makes every second count, fidgeting with his hands and spitting his lines as if certain words pain him. He makes Queeg a complex, complicated man, not just a stock villain."

Sutherland narrated the Apple TV+ docuseries John Lennon: Murder Without a Trial. It was released on Apple's streaming platform on December 6, 2023. In 2024, he starred in Clint Eastwood's courtroom drama Juror No. 2.

At the end of 2025, he began filming a French film shot in English, and written by Luc Besson, titled Father Joe. He has the lead role in the film alongside Al Pacino.

== Personal life ==
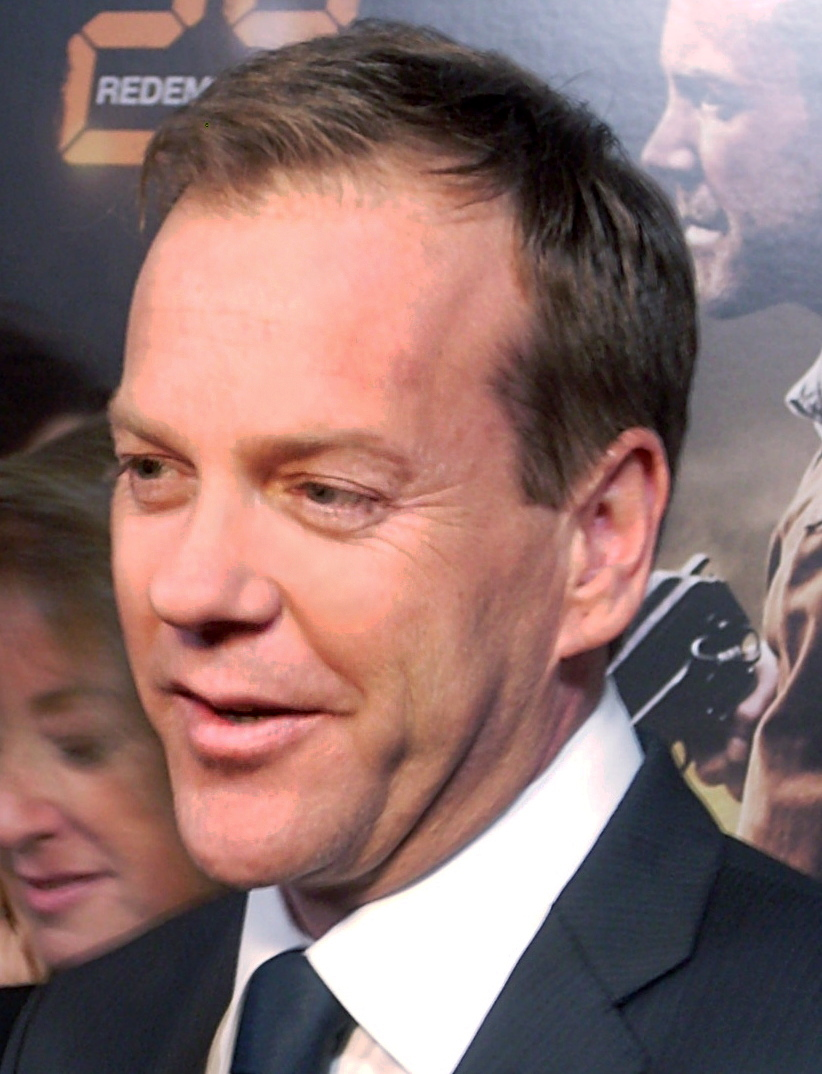
Sutherland in 2008

=== Marriages and relationships ===
On 12 September 1987, Sutherland married Puerto Rican–born Camelia Kath, the widow of Chicago guitarist/singer Terry Kath; she was 34 and he was 20. They had one daughter, Sarah, born on February 18, 1988. Through their marriage, he became stepfather to Camelia's daughter, Michelle, who has two sons with actor Adam Sinclair. Sutherland and Kath divorced in 1990.

Sutherland was engaged to Julia Roberts, his co-star in Flatliners (1990). The pair planned to marry on 14 June 1991 but called off the engagement four days before.

On 29 June 1996, Sutherland married Kelly Winn. The couple separated in 1999, and he filed for divorce in 2004. The divorce was finalized on 16 May 2008.

In the late 1990s, Sutherland purchased a 900-acre (360 ha) ranch in Montana and toured on the rodeo circuit. He dated Bo Derek in 2000.

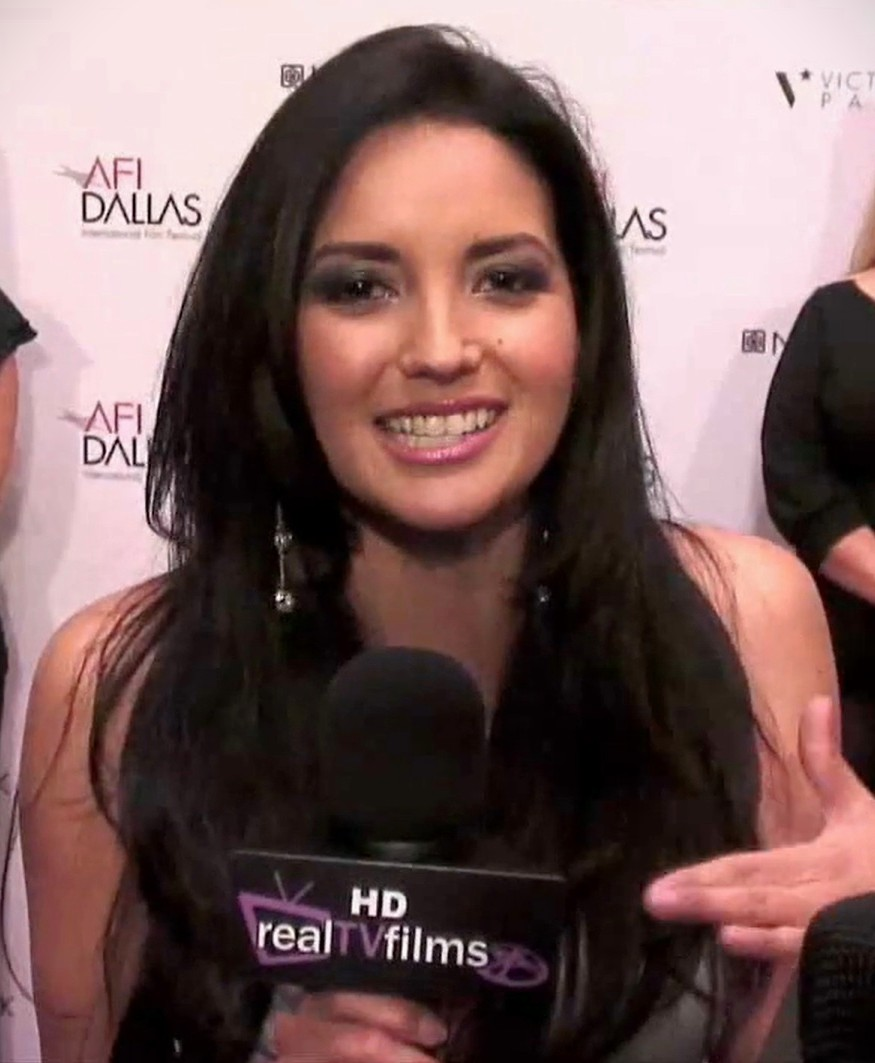
Cindy Vela in 2009

Sutherland began dating model/actress Cindy Vela of Olmito, Texas, sometime in 2014, keeping their relationship private up until 2017, when they began to be seen together in public. Vela and Sutherland became engaged in 2017. As of 2019, they resided in Toluca Lake, Los Angeles. They also own a property in Kingston, New York.

=== Legal issues ===
Sutherland was charged in Los Angeles on 25 September 2007, on drunk driving charges, after failing a field sobriety test. His test exceeded the state's legal blood alcohol limit, and he was later released on a $25,000 bail. It was Sutherland's fourth DUI charge since 1989. Sutherland pleaded no contest to the DUI charge and was sentenced to 48 days in jail. He served his sentence in the Glendale City Jail.

Sutherland surrendered to the NYPD on 6 May 2009 for head-butting fashion designer Jack McCollough, founder and co-designer of Proenza Schouler, at The Mercer Hotel in SoHo following a fundraiser for the Metropolitan Museum of Art. Several weeks later, Sutherland and McCollough issued a joint statement in which Sutherland apologized; police later dropped the charges.

On 12 January 2026, Sutherland was arrested in Hollywood after allegedly physically assaulting a rideshare driver while making felony criminal threats. He was then booked into jail and remained incarcerated for seven hours, until being released after paying a $50,000 bond. He was scheduled to appear in court on 2 February 2026. On 30 January 2026, the Los Angeles County District Attorney's Office transferred the case against Sutherland back to police for further investigation. The decision to transfer this case against Sutherland back to the police would ultimately result in the case being put on hold, with Sutherland's previously scheduled 2 February 2026 court appearance being put on hold as well.

=== Business ventures ===
Sutherland is the co-owner (along with Jude Cole) of the independent record label Ironworks.

Sutherland reportedly fell victim to a financial scam involving cattle in 2010. According to the Associated Press, the perpetrator, Michael Wayne Carr, took US$869,000 from Sutherland, ostensibly in order to buy steers which were never purchased. Carr pleaded guilty and was ordered to pay US$956,000 in restitution to Sutherland and his investment partner.

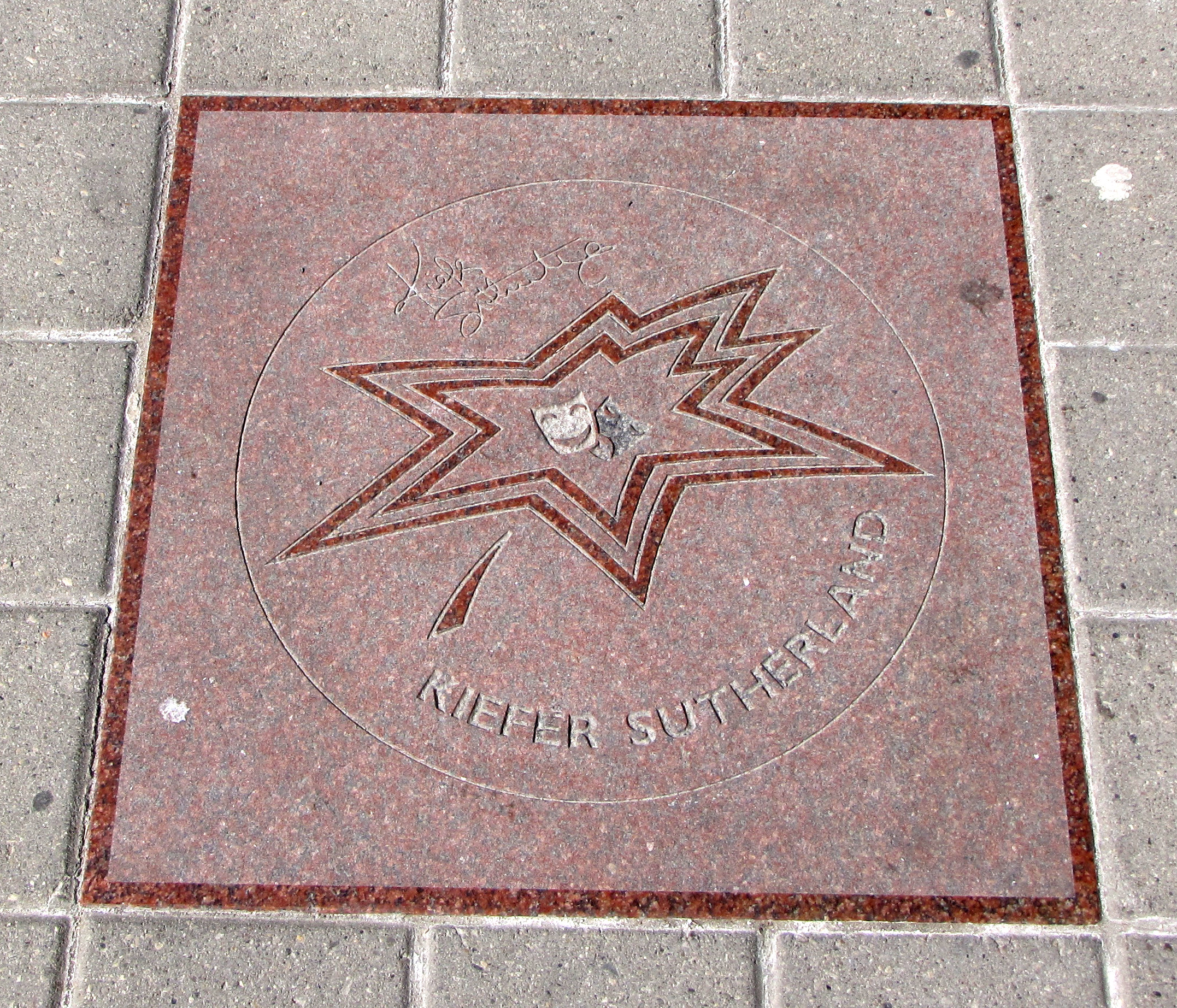
Sutherland's star on Canada's Walk of Fame

=== Political views ===
In his January 2007 interview with Charlie Rose, Sutherland said of his political views:

I believe inherently that we have a responsibility to take care of each other, so when you talk about socialized health care: absolutely, that's a no-brainer. Free universities: absolutely, that's a no-brainer. So, in the definition, I guess those are leaning toward socialist politics. To me, it's common sense.

As a Canadian citizen residing in the United States for work, Sutherland said he is unable to vote in either country. However, he has stated in a 2016 interview that he would have aligned with the New Democratic Party due to his family's history and support for the NDP. Sutherland also supports the Liberal Party's efforts to protect universal health care and criticized the Conservative Party's "undervaluing" of the Canadian public health care system.

In 2019, Sutherland called out Ontario premier Doug Ford and Ottawa MPP Lisa MacLeod for using his late grandfather's name to "push their agendas". He also criticized Ford for claiming that the late Douglas would have approved of the Progressive Conservatives' push for fiscal discipline as he argued that his grandfather's achievements were "never at the expense of social and human services to those in need". MacLeod responded by criticizing an "expensive" bus shelter ad for Designated Survivor outside of Queen's Park while suggesting that Sutherland does not understand the challenges of being a politician compared to "pretending to be one on TV".

=== Charity work ===
Sutherland is a member of a Canadian charity Artists Against Racism.

== Awards and recognition ==
- 2003: Sweden TNT award for Best Foreign TV Personality – Male
- 2005: Canada's Walk of Fame
- 2008: Hollywood Walk of Fame
- 2013: Hasty Pudding Theatricals for Man of the Year
- 2015: Zurich Film Festival for Lifetime Achievement Award

== Discography ==
=== Albums ===
Album	Details	Peak position			Singles
Album	Details	GER	UK	US Country	Singles
Down in a Hole	Release date: 19 August 2016; Label: Ironworks / Warner Bros. Nashville	—	—	35	"Not Enough Whiskey" "Can't Stay Away"
Reckless & Me	Release date: 26 April 2019; Label: Ironworks / BMG Rights Management	28	9	—	"Open Road" "This Is How It's Done" "Something You Love"
Bloor Street	Release date: 21 January 2022; Label: Cooking Vinyl	42	16	—	"Bloor Street" "Two Stepping in Time" "So Full of Love"
Grey	Release date: 29 May 2026; Label: Maple Creek Records	—	31	—	
"—" denotes album that did not chart or was not released

=== Music videos ===
Year	Song	Director
2016	"Not Enough Whiskey"	Kiefer Sutherland / Frank Borin
2016	"Can't Stay Away"	Cal Aurand
2017	"I'll Do Anything"	
2017	"Shirley Jean"	
2019	"This Is How It's Done"	
2019	"Something You Love"	Tom Kirk
2019	"Open Road"	
2021	"Bloor Street"	Tom Kirk
2021	"Two Stepping in Time"	Tom Kirk
2022	"Chasing the Rain"	Nathan Clark
