= Ivonne Coll =

Puerto Rican actress (born 1947)

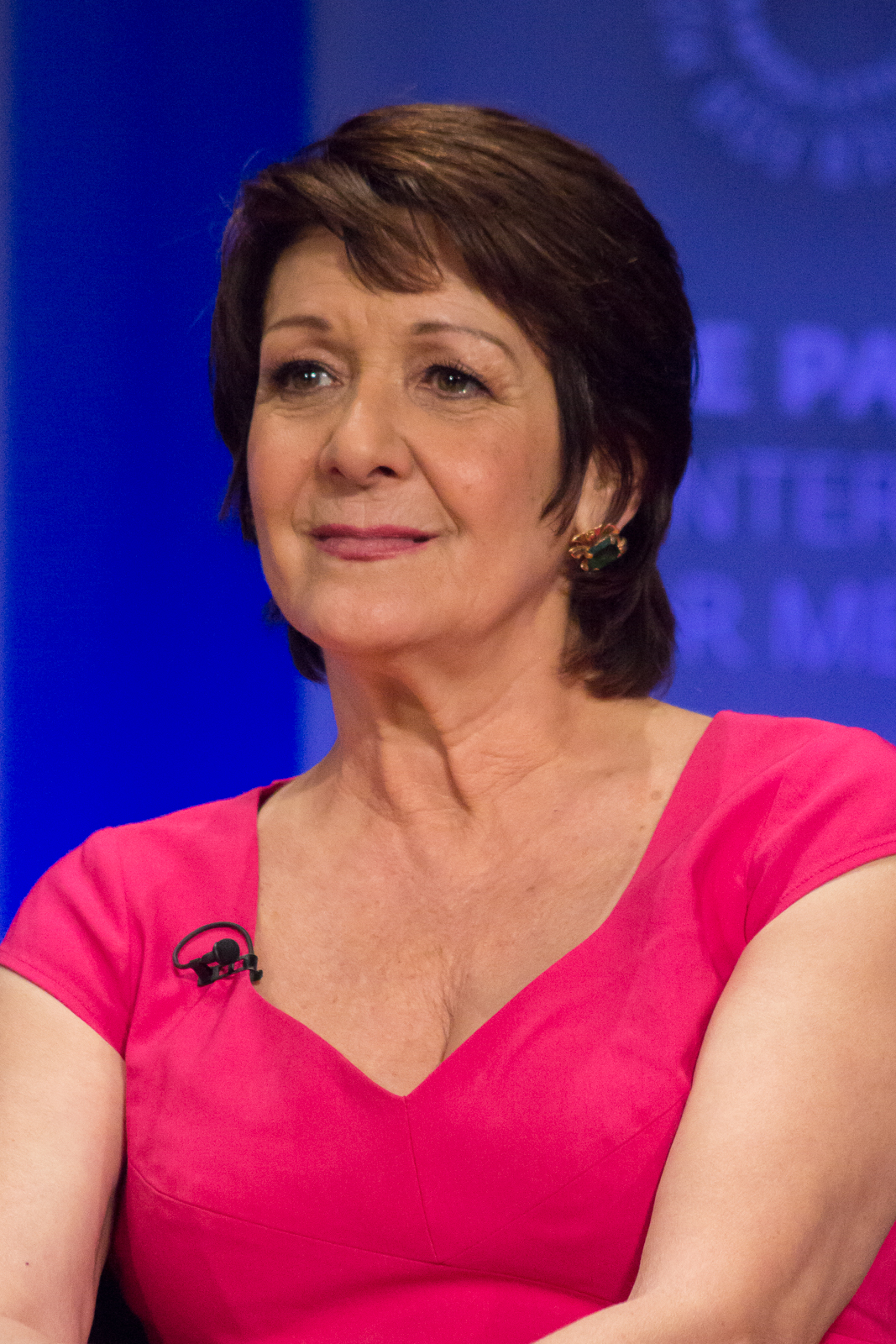
- Coll at the 2015 PaleyFest presentation for Jane the Virgin
- Born: Ivonne Coll Mendoza; June 18, 1947 (age 79); Fajardo, Puerto Rico
- Occupation: Actress
- Years active: 1971–present
- Title: Miss Puerto Rico 1967
- Website: www.ivonnecoll.com

Ivonne Coll Mendoza (born June 18, 1947) is a Puerto Rican actress and beauty pageant titleholder. She was crowned Miss Puerto Rico 1967 and competed in the Miss Universe 1967 pageant but did not place. She later became an actress, appearing in films such as The Godfather Part II and Lean on Me and television series including Switched at Birth, Glee, and Teen Wolf. From 2014 to 2019, Coll starred as Alba Villanueva in the CW comedy-drama series Jane the Virgin.

== Early years ==
Coll was born on June 18, 1947, in Fajardo, Puerto Rico, where she received her primary and secondary education. Her mother, Rosita Mendoza, was a celebrated hairstylist in Puerto Rico. She also has a sister, Millie. After Coll was born, her father left Puerto Rico for New York City, leaving Coll and her mother behind. When Coll was 10, she and her family moved to the capital of Puerto Rico, San Juan; they lived in the Río Piedras and Hato Rey municipalities of the city. Coll was an honor student and graduated from Nuestra Señora del Pilar school. She then enrolled in the University of Puerto Rico (Universidad de Puerto Rico) where she studied Social Sciences. Coll started her career as a fashion model. In 1966, she represented Fajardo in the Miss Puerto Rico pageant and won. Coll remained the only representative from Fajardo to win the national title until Ashley Cariño won in 2022.

== Career ==
=== 1971–1975: Una chica llamada Ivonne Coll ===
External audio
- You may listen to Ivonne Coll narrating in Spanish her experiences in the show "Una chica llamada Ivonne Coll" on YouTube

At the end of 1971, the owner of television channel 11 in Puerto Rico, Rafael Perez Perry spotted Coll. His competitor had a show with a young starlet by the name of Iris Chacón. Perez Perry believed that Coll could have a show of her own to compete. Therefore, he sponsored the show which was called Una chica llamada Ivonne Coll (A girl named Ivonne Coll), which ran from 1971 to 1975.

In 1976, Coll moved to Los Angeles, California, where she took dance and singing classes in the Academy of Stage and Cinema Arts. She landed a part in a theater play called "Burning Beach", which was presented in the American Place Theater.

=== Career in the United States ===
In 1979, Coll moved back to New York, where she participated in various Off Broadway productions such as: Spain 1980, As You Like It, Romeo and Juliet, and Macbeth. In New York, film director Francis Ford Coppola recruited her for the role of "Yolanda", a Havana night club singer in The Godfather II. Although her role was small, the experience would serve her well in the future. She was credited as "Yvonne Coll".

In 1989, Coll played a minor role of a teacher named Mrs. Santos, in the film Lean on Me written by Michael Schiffer, directed by John G. Avildsen and starring Morgan Freeman. She participated in the following productions: Orinoco, The Masses Are Asses (a play by Pedro Pietri), Medio Comuñas, Goodbye Castro, and Pancho Diablo (with Fernando Allende and Sully Diaz).

Coll won an ACE Award for best actress for Orinoco. When not acting, Coll attended the HB Studio and Lee Strasberg's Acting Studio. Among the television series on which she appeared were: Pacific Blue, Crisis Center, An American Family, The Bold and the Beautiful, Chicago Hope, Malibu Shores, NYPD Blue, and L.A. Law.

=== Return to Puerto Rico ===
When Coll returned to Puerto Rico, she was invited to participate in La verdadera historia de Pedro Navaja and Paper Flowers. She had a role in the locally produced film, La gran Fiesta (The Grand Party), and in the TV show Cuqui. In 2002, she appeared in the film Besos de Fuego.

In October 2006, Coll played the title role in Bertolt Brecht's Mother Courage at the Berkeley Rep Theater in Berkeley, California. From 2011 to 2014, she had the recurring roles on Switched at Birth, Glee, and Teen Wolf. Beginning in the fall of 2014, Coll become part of the main cast as Alba Villanueva, grandmother of Jane Villanueva, in the CW comedy series, Jane the Virgin.

In 2015, Coll was honored by the organizers of the National Puerto Rican Day Parade with a lifetime achievement award for her long and varied career.

In 2016, Coll performed in "Hero Theatre's Festival Irene: Celebrating the Legacy of María Irene Fornés."

In 2019, Coll moved back permanently to Puerto Rico.

== Personal life ==
Coll has never married and has no children.

== Filmography ==
=== Film ===
Year	Title	Role	Notes
1974	The Godfather Part II	Yolanda	
1985	La Gran Fiesta	Dona Tula	
1989	Lean on Me	Mrs. Santos	
1990	A Killer Among Us	Francine Cortez	Television film
1995	As Good as Dead	Mexican Woman	Television film
1996	The Disappearance of Garcia Lorca	Angelina Gonzalez	
1997	The Pest	Gladyz	
1997	Alien Nation: The Udara Legacy	Officer Wilcox	Television film
1998	Strangeland	Rose Stravelli	
1999	Instinct	Dr. Marzuez	
1999	In Too Deep	Mrs. Batista	
2000	Waking the Dead	Gisela Higgens	
2000	Michael Angel	Killan's Mother	
2000	Details	Mother	Short film
2002	Scorcher	Mayor Salizar	
2004	Jesus the Driver	Marisol	
2006	Splinter	Mom	
2007	De pura cepa	Carmen	Short film
2009	The Night Girl	Esperanza	Short film
2012	Hemingway & Gellhorn	Gypsy Crone	Television film
2013	Counterpunch	Grandma Daisy	
2014	Los Scavengers	Remi	
2015	Endgame	Abuelita	

=== Television ===
Year	Title	Role	Notes
1967	Miss Universe 1967	Herself (contestant)	Representative for Puerto Rico
1971–1975	A girl named Ivonne Coll	Herself	
1990	DEA	Mrs. Clemente	Series regular, 10 episodes
1990	The Flash	Carmen Hijuelos	Episode: "Child's Play"
1990	Gabriel's Fire	Dr. Luisa Hernandez / Mrs. Pena	Episodes: "Money Walks" and "Judgements"
1991	Wings	Mooshta	Episode: "Duet for Cello and Plane"
1994	L.A. Law	Judge Leslie Peyton	Episode: "Silence Is Golden"
1995	Chicago Hope	Mrs. Ponce	Episode: "Wild Cards"
1996	Malibu Shores	Mrs. Martinez	Episodes: "Cheating Hearts" and "The Competitive Edge"
1996–1997	The Bold and the Beautiful	Alicia Cortéz	Recurring role
1997	Crisis Center	Janie Sheppard	Episodes: "Where Truth Lies" and "Shots"
1996–1998	Pacific Blue	Rosa Del Toro	Recurring role, 3 episodes
1999	The Practice	Dr. Maria Hernandez	Episode: "Committed"
2000	NYPD Blue	Sonia Lopez	Episode: "The Man with Two Right Shoes"
2000	City of Angels	Miss Hernandez	Episodes: "Weenis Between Us" and "The High Cost of Living"
2001	The Huntress	Nelda Ramos	Episode: "Run Ricky Run"
2001	Roswell	Ms. Ramirez	Episodes: "Significant Others" and "To Have and to Hold"
2001–2002	The Division	Mrs. Ramirez / Elaine Hunt	Episodes: "There But for Fortune" and "Secrets, Lies and Weddings"
2003	Judging Amy	Nurse Abby Corazon	Episode: "Judging Eric"
2003	Six Feet Under	Vanessa's Therapist	Episode: "Death Works Overtime"
2003	Skin	Amelia	Episodes: "Secrets & Lies" and "Endorsement"
2003	Joan of Arcadia	Marlene	Recurring role, 3 episodes
2005	Without a Trace	Concebida Hernandez	Episode: "Neither Rain Nor Sleet"
2005	Veronica Mars	Knitting Grandmother	Episode: "One Angry Veronica"
2006	Crossing Jordan	Mrs. Salazar	Episode: "Dreamland"
2006	CSI: Crime Scene Investigation	Marsha Kendric	Episode: "Poppin' Tags"
2007	Dirt	Cleaning Lady	Episode: "This Is Not Your Father's Hostage Situation"
2007	Heroes	Nidia	Episode: "Chapter Two 'Lizards'"
2008	The Young and the Restless	Rosa Flinn	Recurring role
2009	ER	Grandmother	Episode: "And in the End..."
2010	Cold Case	Sonia Espinosa	Episode: "Bombers"
2011–2014	Switched at Birth	Adriana Vasquez	Recurring role, 28 episodes
2014	Teen Wolf	Araya Calavera	Recurring role, 5 episodes
2011–2015	Glee	Alma Lopez	Recurring role, 3 episodes
2014–2019	Jane the Virgin	Alba Villanueva	Series regular Nominated—Imagen Award for Best Supporting Actress – Television (2015)
2016	Elena of Avalor	Doña Angelica	the ghost chef grandmother of Carmen Rosa Guadalupe Guzman and Julio Osvaldo Valentino Guzman, appears in episode 9 "A Day to Remember"
2018	One Day at a Time	Esme	Guest starring as the new love interest of Dr. Berkowitz (Stephen Tobolowsky), in episode 7 of Season 2, 'Exclusive'.
2018	Fancy Nancy	Ms. Camilla	Voice role in episode 7 Season 1, 'La Danse Of Friendship/Shoe La La'
2020	Lucifer	Mother Angelica	Episode: "Detective Amenadiel"

== See also ==
- List of Puerto Ricans
- Irish immigration to Puerto Rico
- History of women in Puerto Rico

== Notes ==
Awards and achievements
Preceded by Carol Bajandas	Miss Puerto Rico; 1967	Succeeded by Marlene Carrasquillo
