= El Americano: The Movie =

- Mexican theatrical release poster
- Directed by: Ricardo Arnaiz; Mike Kunkel
- Screenplay by: Ricardo Arnaiz; Richard Pursel; Phil Roman
- Story by: Ricardo Arnaiz; Dulce Belchez; Fernando Lewels
- Produced by: Gerry Cardoso; Phil Roman; Alex Flores; Michael D. Olmos
- Starring: Rico Rodriguez; Kate del Castillo; Cheech Marin; Gabriel Iglesias; Lisa Kudrow; Edward James Olmos
- Cinematography: Ricardo de la Rosa
- Edited by: Grecia Villar
- Music by: Leoncio Lara Bon
- Production companies: Animex; Anáhuac Films; Olmos Productions; Phil Roman Entertainment
- Distributed by: Never Landing Data Distribution (Mexico); Grindstone Entertainment Group (United States)
- Release dates: 22 January 2016 (Mexico); 13 June 2017 (United States)
- Running time: 87 minutes
- Countries: Mexico; United States
- Languages: Spanish; English
- Budget: $4 million

El Americano: The Movie (also known as Americano) is a 2016 animated family film produced by Animex Producciones, Olmos Productions and Phil Roman Entertainment, and is directed by Ricardo Arnaiz and ex-Disney animator Mike Kunkel. The film features an ensemble voice cast of mostly Hispanic American and Mexican actors led by Rico Rodriguez, Edward James Olmos, Cheech Marin, Kate del Castillo, Paul Rodriguez, Gabriel Iglesias, Erik Estrada, and Lisa Kudrow.

The first major animated co-production between studios in Mexico and the United States, it is also the first international and CG production for Animex, as well it being its fourth film. FilmSharks International announced that they have acquired the film's international rights.

The film was released in Mexico on 22 January 2016 in Digital 3D and 2D theaters, distributed by Never Landing Digital Distribution. The film has received mixed to negative reviews from critics and was a huge box office bomb, earning $587,592 on a $4 million budget.

Lionsgate's Grindstone Entertainment Group released the film direct-to-video and VOD on June 13, 2017, under the title Americano.

== Plot ==
Cuco is a Mexican boy parrot that would rather imitate the stunts of his TV super-parrot hero, El Americano, than help with his chores at the family bird circus. When a gang of birds threatens his ringmaster father and takes over the circus, Cuco sets off on a journey to Hollywood to enlist his hero in his fight, only to discover the hero within himself.

== Cast ==
English cast

- Rico Rodriguez as Cuco
- Kate del Castillo as Rayito^{*}
- Cheech Marin as Martin
- Gabriel Iglesias as Garza García
- Lisa Kudrow as Lucille Van Starr^{*}
- Edward James Olmos as Gayo "El Jefe"^{*}
- Grecia Villar as Paquito^{*}
- Paul Rodriguez as Divino^{*}
- Argelia Atilano as Lori^{*}
- Ricardo Sanchez as Vovo^{*}
- K. C. Porter as Karl^{*}
- Erik Estrada as Ponch Wingstall^{*}
- Adal Ramones as Trueno^{*}
- Don Cheto as Dovo^{*}
- Héctor Suárez as Eddie Navarro^{*}
- Pierre Angelo as El Mexicano^{*}

Spanish cast

- Aleks Syntek as Cuco
- Gabriel Villar as Martin
- Mino D'Blanc as Garza García

^* Those cast members have also voiced their respective characters in the Spanish-language version.

== Production ==
=== Development ===
Production began in January 2011 when director/writer and Animex founder, Ricardo Arnaiz, became interested in doing an American co-production after the box-office disappointment of Nikté at his home country, knowing that U.S.-produced films do better at the Mexican film market. The idea of the film's plot was brought up when he visited the United States and met producer Gerry Cardoso, who brought up the idea of birds, traveling from Spain to Mexico. Arnaiz insisted to change the setting to the United States. “I said it would be great to make them go from Mexico to the United States, so we started from that,” said Arnaiz. “We were very careful to be respectful of both countries. We wanted to tell a story about how borders are just a line on a map and when you are honest and you do things the right way there are a lot of possibilities out there for everybody.” Bringing the project to the United States was one of the biggest challenges in the film's development.

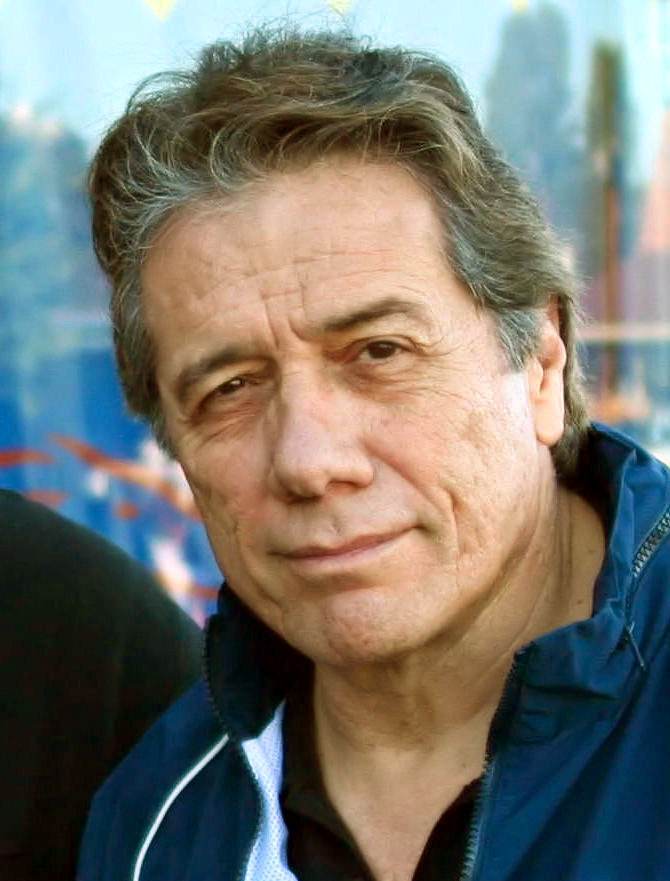
Edward James Olmos voiced Gayo "El Jefe" in both English and Spanish languages, and served as the film's executive producer. Prior to his work, he has watched La leyenda de la Nahuala.

He later met actor Edward James Olmos, when he found that Olmos was "a hit" and a fan of La leyenda de la Nahuala. After reading the script, Olmos agreed to join the film's production team and voice cast. “We’re delighted to be working with Edward James Olmos and his production company here in the US. It's a story we have been working on for the last three years and we feel we have a really strong team in place to execute this film scheduled in 2013.”

"At the opening of the FICM to present the progress of this project is important because Animex [was] born in Puebla 13 years ago, and is the fourth film and will for many more, with El Americano, we ventured to the U.S. and we want to impact [a] Hollywood film [...]"
— Ricardo Arnaiz, director and co-writer of Americano

On 26 September 2013, the film was presented at Ibero Puebla, revealing new screenshots and clips. During production, Edward James Olmos had recorded his voice before the animation process. Many cast members were required to act out their roles before recording their voices. According to director Ricardo Arnaiz, it is the most expensive film from Animex Producciones and the first to exceed over $29 million pesos.

=== Animation ===
The visual effects and animation production were done by Boxel Studio in Tijuana. Additional animation and crowding was handled by Cutting Edge Productions in Philippines. In an interview with Andres Reyes Botello, founder of Boxel Studios, Ricardo Arnaiz initially stated he originally intended to produce the film in traditional animation, but Edward James Olmos insisted Arnaiz use CG animation as the best chance of the film's success. "Back then, he was explaining to me his situation with his 2D animation studio and his curiosity about making El Americano into a full 3D CGI production", said Andres Reyes Botello. "From there, we instantly got on to a good relationship and started working on the development for the characters and environments, doing some animation, lighting, and rendering tests for this film." Arnaiz did not have much experience in CG animation. As a director of Nikte, he finds the transition from traditional animation to computer animation "complicated" since its vision in the field of animation was "cartoonish". This was not changed with El Americano; however, Arnaiz wanted to capture some scenes in traditional animation.

Later, after being impressed by Boxel Studios' works, Arnaiz has decided to partner with the studio, which primarily focuses on animation for video games and advertising. “They were very creative, they had a lot of knowledge and I said: ‘Would you be interested in doing a movie with me? I don’t know anything about CGI, you don’t know anything about making movies — let’s combine and create this thing together,” says Arnaiz. For assistance, Arnaiz tapped animation veteran Raul Garcia, and Mike Kunkel, who is Arnaiz's personal friend and longed-hoped to work with him, and brought them to Boxel Studios. “They taught everyone how to make animation, Hollywood style, and in Mexico, we taught the Americans how to do it with low budgets,” said Arnaiz. A total of 25 animators have worked on this film. Arnaiz has stated that the development of the film was challenging. However, the film was finished on time and on budget. “The biggest challenge was to get it to the level that everyone was hoping for us,” said Arnaiz. “They thought at first that we were going to go to like a direct-to-video quality at the most, and once we showed them some clips they were really excited about it.” Development for the film finished in August 2013.

=== Casting ===
The film features a distinctive ensemble voice cast, primarily consisting of famous Mexican and Hispanic American actors. Director Ricardo Arnaiz was satisfied with the casting, which was one of the biggest challenges of the film. "It was the cast [in] which I [have] dreamed [of] since the beginning of the project," said Arnaiz. "Both my producers in Mexico and the United States moved to get this great talent. They quickly fell in love [with the] story, characters, theme potential, and ambition brand internationally."

On 17 April 2013, actress Lisa Kudrow has joined the voice cast as Lucille in both English and Spanish versions. She is the only non-Hispanic cast member.

== Music ==
The film's original score was composed by Leoncio Lara, whom he previously worked for animated films produced by Ánima Estudios.

The soundtrack features 12 original songs written and composed by various Latin artists, and three score pieces composed by Leoncio Lara Bon. The album features the song "Hasta el Cielo Alcanzar" (film's main song) written and performed by six-time Latin GRAMMY nominated Aleks Syntek. The album also contains songs by La Arrolladora Banda Limón, Los Tucanes de Tijuana, 3Ball Mty. featuring Don Cheto, Amanditita, Duelo, Horacio Palencia and many more. The Soundtrack is produced by Gerry Cardoso, Ricardo Arnaiz and Tomas Rubio.

== Release and reception ==
=== Premiere and theatrical ===
The film premiered at the Morelia International Film Festival on 22 October 2013. The film had its U.S. screening at The Strong National Museum of Play theater in Rochester, New York on 15 March 2014. It was shown in both Spanish and English. The film was presented at San Diego Comic-Con on 25 July 2014. The title of the conference is "Big Ideas for Movies: Crossing the Borders with Mexican Animation".

It had an advanced screening at the 22nd Annual San Diego Film Festival on 14 March 2015. The film had its world carpet premiere on 14 May 2015 at the Regal Cinemas L.A. Live Stadium 14 theater in Los Angeles, California.

As of 2016, the film had been distributed in many countries throughout Central and South America, Europe, and Asia. Most importantly, this is the first film to be supported by Instituto Mexicano de Cinematografía (IMCINE) that originated from the state of Puebla. "A project is supported by Fidecine and EFICINE when they see it consolidated, and with high expectations," said Arnaiz. "Films like Don Gato (Top Cat) or Una Película de Huevos have a great role in the box office and we also hope that this film [El Americano] can open doors for more animation support in Mexico." However, the film only received a limited release, opening only in 160 theaters nationwide. This was due to being distributed by an independent company, Never Landing Data Distribution, despite the film's immersive cast, budget, and its notable first U.S.–Mexico co-production status. "They wanted Edward [James Olmos] and choose Neverlanding Pictures S.A.P.I., Alejandro Sugich, a Mexican distributor of content and we released 160 copies, but we hope to do well to be in more rooms," Arnaiz said.

The film has faced numerous delays before its release; the film was originally intended for release September 2013 release, then a Summer 2014 release, and then a Summer 2015 release. In Mexico, the film was released on January 22, 2016 in Digital 3D and 2D theaters.

As for the United States, the film was originally planned for a theatrical release to open at about 1,200 theaters across the country distributed by Freestyle Releasing. However, the film was instead later released straight-to-video and on VOD on June 13, 2017 by Grindstone Entertainment and Lionsgate Home Entertainment.

=== Immigration impact ===
The film focuses on immigration, in which protagonist Cuco and his friends travel to the Mexico–United States border. Edward James Olmos, the film's executive producer and voice of Gayo, found this film a perfect opportunity for thousands of Mexican children for them to know their roots. "There are successful films that are very strong, but it goes straight to the hearts of children," said Olmos during a press conference in Mexico City, promoting the film. "The policy of this film is beautiful! Ricardo Arnaiz is homered as ever! As Erik Estrada's character [said] in the film: 'You could fly nonstop, but they came here [to America]. What fun!'" Olmos also hoped that this film could revisit the ongoing illegal immigration epidemic in the United States, and reform then-President Barack Obama to legalize millions of undocumented immigrants in the country.

=== Rating in Mexico controversy ===
Upon its theatrical release in Mexico, the Dirección General de Radio, Televisión y Cinematografía (RTC) has given the film a B rating due to the film's violence and "occasional" sexuality, which required ages 12 years or older (similar to the MPAA's PG-13 rating), sparking controversy upon families and the filmmakers. "The narrative can be complex; it presents some degree of violence, not extreme, for specific reasons and not related to sexuality, making clear [for] its consequences," said RTC. "The nudes are brief and not [just] detailed and suggested sex scenes. You can address the issue of addiction and drugs, but without exhibiting their consumption. Verbal violence can not be extreme." Reports asked director Ricardo Arnaiz about the film's rating issue, but didn't initially respond. On his Twitter, he has posted "Unfortunately, some people won't believe or want [to see] the film." The film's B rating have concerned parents whether or not they find the film appropriate for their children to see, which it could be said to contribute to the film's box-office under-performance. Executive producer Edward James Olmos responded to the film's issue, saying that "El Americano is a film that children are going crazy to go see something wonderful that will represent Mexico and the world, showing the work, values and cultures of Mexicans with a family history." After receiving complaints from social media, the RTC checked its database and finally confirmed the rating as an "error". The RTC has changed the film's rating from B to AA, which allows the attendance of children ages 7 years and older.

=== Box office ===
Although the film was projected to open at #2 place at the Mexican box office. the film however, as an independently released film, it is considered a moderate box-office success, releasing in only 129 locations, and topping other independent releases, such as Kahlil Gibran's The Prophet and Plastic.

=== Critical response ===
The film has received mixed-to-negative reviews from critics. On Rotten Tomatoes, the film received a 40% approval rating based on 5 reviews, with an average score of 2/10.

== Future ==
Director Ricardo Arnaiz has expressed plans for a sequel, with the support of executive producer Edward James Olmos. However, they want the proceeding film to be successful and reach 200 copies by the film's second week in theaters. There has not been any further information regarding a planned sequel.
