= The Bicycle Thief (Modern Family) =

- Modern Family episode
- Claire (Julie Bowen) and Phil (Ty Burrell) meeting their new neighbor, Desiree (Brandy Ledford)
- Episode no.: Season 1 Episode 2
- Directed by: Jason Winer
- Written by: Bill Wrubel
- Cinematography by: Jim Bagdonas
- Editing by: Jonathan Schwartz
- Production code: 1ARG02
- Original air date: September 30, 2009

Guest appearances
- Brandy Ledford as Desiree; Julia Lehman as Danielle; Lindsey Stoddart as Helen

Episode chronology
← Previous "Pilot"	Next → "Come Fly with Me"
- Modern Family season 1

"The Bicycle Thief" is the second episode of the first season of the American family sitcom television series Modern Family. It originally aired on ABC in the United States on September 30, 2009. The episode was written by Bill Wrubel and directed by Jason Winer.

In the episode, Jay tries to show his stepson he can be a good father; Phil attempts to teach his son a lesson by stealing his bike, but suffers the consequences when he discovers he stole the wrong bike; while Cameron and Mitchell put their newly-adopted daughter Lily in Day Care Center and try to act straight.

"The Bicycle Thief" received positive reviews from critics, mostly in regard to Ty Burrell's performance as Phil Dunphy. The episode was viewed by 9.99 million viewers and dropped four-tenths from the previous week's episode, "Pilot" in the 18-49 demographic, tying with Criminal Minds in the timeslot according to Nielsen Media Research.

== Plot ==
The question of the episode in the teaser concerns being a good dad.

Phil (Ty Burrell) and Claire (Julie Bowen) go on a bike-ride with Luke (Nolan Gould), who is riding his sister's bike because he is not responsible enough to own a bike. While the Dunphys are riding, they come across Desiree (Brandy Ledford), a newly single mother who has a child at Luke's school. Phil flirts with her, to Claire's disgust.

Phil decides to buy Luke a brand new green bike after Jay (Ed O'Neill) ridicules Luke for riding a girl's bike and tells him that he is responsible for it. When Phil comes across a bike that is similar to Luke's new bike, he immediately assumes Luke left the bike unlocked. Phil jumps on the bike to take it home, feeling that Claire will be upset with him for not listening to her. On his way home, he comes across Desiree and sets the bike down in order to help her get into her home - she had locked herself out. When returning to leave, the bike has disappeared. Phil visits the bike store to buy a replacement but when he gets home and confronts Luke, he learns that Luke never left the bike. When trying to take the replacement bike to the place where he had stolen the second bike, he is confronted by Claire who says he should not be sneaky and she forgives him - only to have Desiree show up with the second bike, saying her neighbor had placed it in her garage while Phil was in her bedroom. Phil eventually places one of the replacement bikes back in the spot from where he had stolen the second bike and he is confronted by a pair of kids who claim the bike.

The second plot line begins at the Delgado-Pritchett residence where Jay helps Manny (Rico Rodriguez) to set up a fan they bought. Jay refuses to read the instructions or listen to Manny while he reads them and gets shocked twice. Manny and Jay have an argument after one of the blades falls off the fan causing Manny to shout that he wished Jay had never married Gloria (Sofía Vergara). Later, as Jay is getting ready for his trip to the wine country with Gloria, he gets a call from Manny's father. Manny's father says that he is winning at craps and does not want to leave the table and take Manny to Disneyland as promised, something that disgusts Jay. Going outside to tell Manny, he makes up an excuse saying that his father will not be able to make it due to flight delays. He then tells Manny that the limousine was sent by his father to take all three of them to Disneyland, even though originally it was for Jay and Gloria's trip.

In third plot line of the episode, Cameron (Eric Stonestreet) and Mitchell (Jesse Tyler Ferguson) go to the playschool with Lily (Ella Hiller/Jaden Hiller). When they find out that all the other kids are much more advanced than Lily they decide to steal some blocks that another child has stacked and claim that Lily did it. When the employee informs them of the CCTV cameras and that they can have a copy of Lily stacking the blocks, they quickly leave.

Jay presents the final moments of the episode, answering the opening question by saying that the biggest part of being a good dad, is simply being there.

== Reception ==
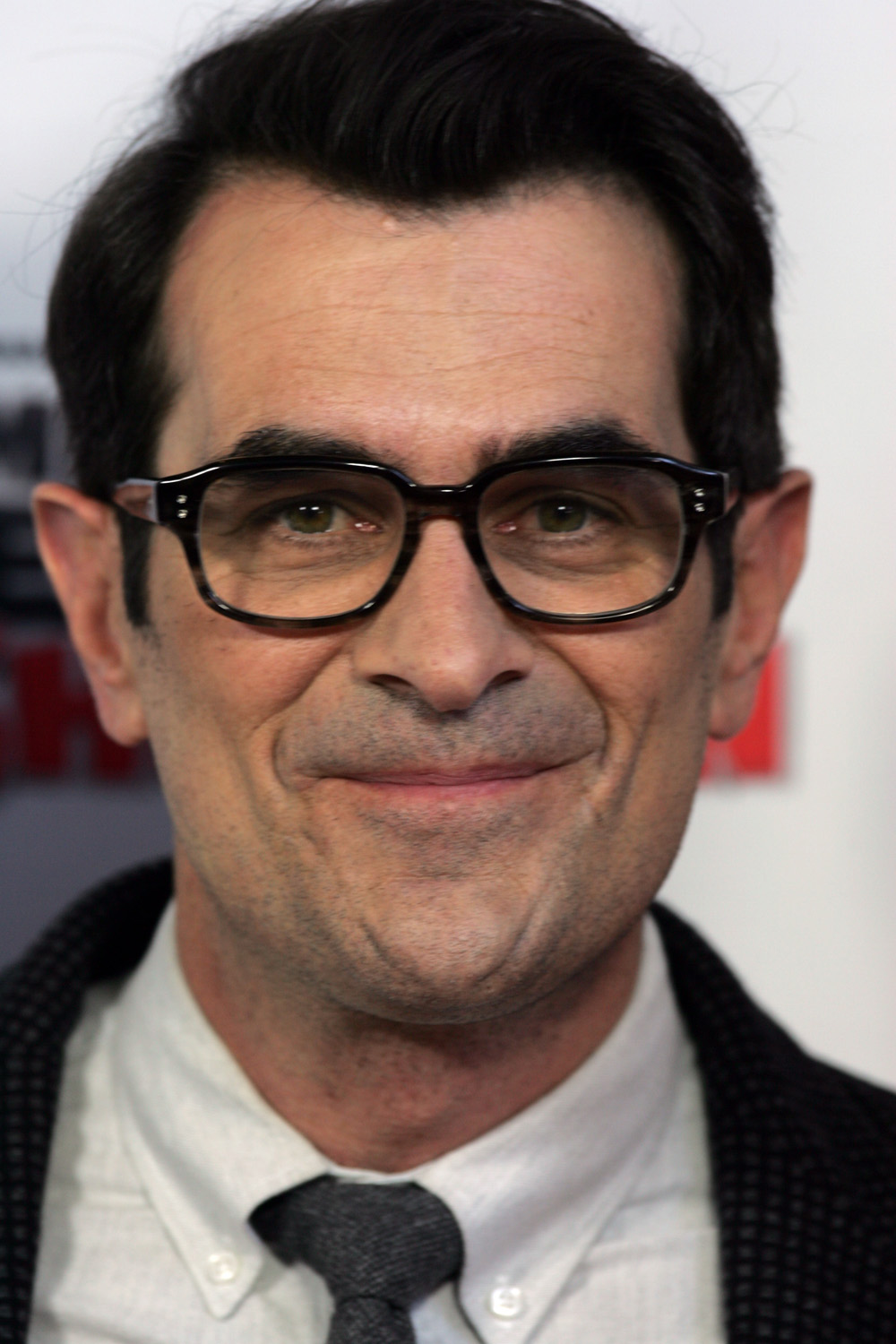
Ty Burrell's performance of Phil Dunphy was praised by critics.

=== Ratings ===
In its original American broadcast, "The Bicycle Thief" was viewed by an estimated by 9.993 million households and got a 3.8 rating/10% share in the 18-49 demographic tying for first in its timeslot with Criminal Minds going down 4 tenths from the pilot episode according to the Nielsen Media Research.

=== Reviews ===
"The Bicycle Thief" received positive reviews.

Robert Canning of IGN gave the episode a 7.2 saying it was "Decent" and "Though the tone was still fun, Wednesday night's outing felt a bit too comfortable, as if we were watching an episode from season three."

James Poniewozik of Time said "whether the characters are one-joke specials or if they have more dimensions to them. So far, with its second episode, Modern Family is meeting that test just fine."

Jason Hughes of TV Squad gave the episode a positive review saying "Its brilliance in its simplicity, brilliantly executed. Not only did we get so many funny moments throughout, but if we paid close attention, we learned several lessons about life and parenthood between the laughs."

Donna Bowman of The A.V. Club gave the episode an A− saying "This episode is even better than the pilot. It deepens the neuroses that drive the characters, it solidifies the style, and it differentiates itself nicely -- in the kinds of stories it tells and the tone and method of the telling -- from Arrested Development, the touchstone for most of the descriptions of the pilot."

TV Fanatic gave the episode a good review and remarked "On last night's Modern Family, each of the fathers of the family were asked what it means to be a great dad and it led to three great stories."

Michael Slezak of Entertainment Weekly said "The good news about Modern Family‘s hilarious second episode is that it proved the show isn’t going to just be a one-hit wonder."

Many of the critics have praised Ty Burrell's performance of Phil Dunphy. Michael Slezak said "MVP for this episode, which might as well have been titled “The Sins of the Father,” was definitely Ty Burrell’s Phil, who got himself into all kinds of bizarre trouble by going against his wife’s wishes and buying a bike for his irresponsible son." Robert Canning said "Ty Burrell as Phil has some great nervous comedic timing and the scene where his wife introduces the new neighbor was the highlight of this plotline.".
