= Down in a Hole (album) =

Studio album by Kiefer Sutherland
- Released: August 19, 2016
- Recorded: 2014–15
- Genre: Country; Americana
- Label: Ironworks; Warner Bros. Nashville
- Producer: Jude Cole

Kiefer Sutherland chronology
Down in a Hole (2016)	Reckless & Me (2019)

Singles from Down in a Hole
- 1. "Not Enough Whiskey" Released: 28 March 2016; 2. "Can't Stay Away" Released: 27 July 2016

Down in a Hole is the debut studio album by actor Kiefer Sutherland, produced by Jude Cole from the label Ironworks which Sutherland co-owns. The album was released on August 19, 2016.

== Background ==
Down in a Hole is a country album containing 11 songs written by Sutherland and Cole. The actor first announced his venture in music in 2015. The first single "Not Enough Whiskey" was released on March 28, 2016. Since then, Sutherland went on tour in entire North America with his band and even appeared at the 2016 Academy of Country Music Awards. On August 25, 2016, Sutherland performed on Jimmy Kimmel Live! to promote his album.

The music video for the song "Can't Stay Away" was released on July 27, 2016.

On 6 March 2017, a music video for "I'll Do Anything" was released.

On 28 April 2017, a music video for "Shirley Jean" was released.

Sutherland continued to tour supporting for the album throughout 2017 and 2018.

== Track listing ==
No.	Title	Writer(s)	Length
1.	"Can't Stay Away"	Kiefer Sutherland, Jude Cole	3:31
2.	"Truth in Your Eyes"	Sutherland, Cole	4:22
3.	"I'll Do Anything"	Sutherland, Cole	3:21
4.	"Not Enough Whiskey"	Sutherland, Cole	3:57
5.	"Going Home"	Sutherland, Cole, Jason Wade	4:26
6.	"Calling Out Your Name"	Sutherland, Cole	4:26
7.	"My Best Friend"	Sutherland, Cole	4:36
8.	"Shirley Jean"	Sutherland, Cole	4:17
9.	"All She Wrote"	Sutherland, Cole	4:54
10.	"Down in a Hole"	Sutherland, Cole	3:47
11.	"Gonna Die"	Sutherland, Cole	3:10
Total length:			44:47

== Personnel ==
- Kiefer Sutherland – lead and background vocals, composer, guitar
- Jude Cole – bass, composer, guitar, keyboards, mandolin, organ, percussion, producer, background vocals
- Jim Cox – organ, piano, wurlitzer
- Florian Ammon – drums, recording
- Keith Armstrong – mixing engineer
- Jason Wade – composer, guitar
- Carmel Echols – background vocals
- Michael Gurley – background vocals
- Chaz Mason – background vocals
- Samantha Nelson – background vocals
- Nik Karpen – mixing engineer
- Aaron Embry – wurlitzer
- Jordan Whitlock – background vocals
- Alan Okuye – organ
- Brian MacLeod – drums, percussion
- Phil Parlapiano – accordion, organ
- Chris Murguia – engineer
- Greg Leisz – guitar, pedal steel guitar
- Patrick Leonard – organ, wurlitzer
- Danny Kastner – piano
- Gavin Lurssen – mastering
- Chris Lord-Alge – mixing, organ
- Rick Woolstenhulme Jr. – drums

== Chart performance ==
The album made its debut at No. 18 on the Americana/Folk Albums chart and No. 35 on Top Country Albums, with 1,000 copies sold according to Nielsen Music. The album has sold 8,100 copies in the United States as of May 2017.

Chart (2016)	Peak position
US Top Country Albums (Billboard)	35
US Top Heatseekers Albums (Billboard)	13
