= Rico Rodriguez (actor) =

American actor (born 1998)

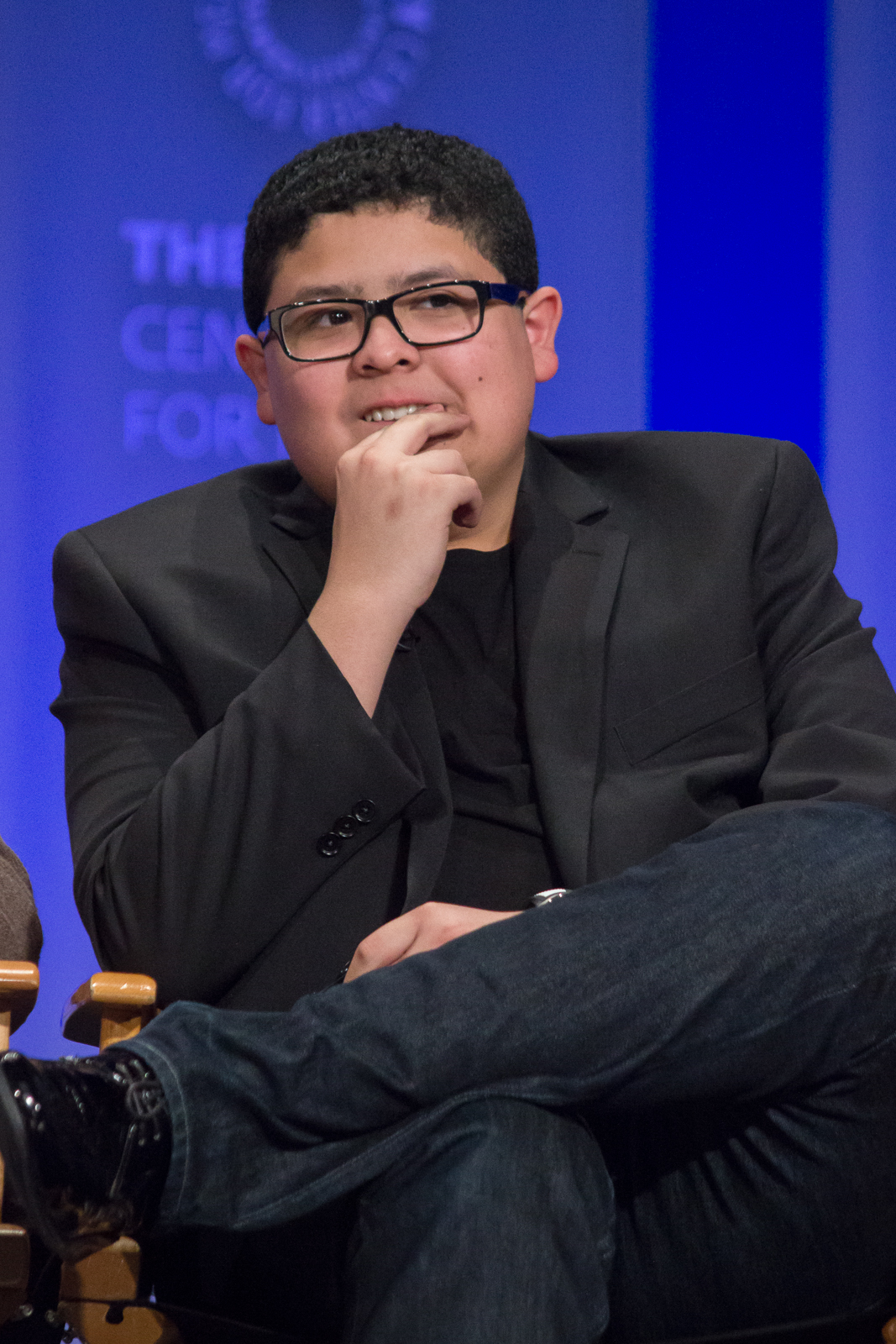
- Rodriguez at the Paley Center for Media in 2015
- Born: July 31, 1998 (age 28); Bryan, Texas, U.S.
- Occupation: Actor
- Years active: 2006–present
- Notable credit: Modern Family (2009–2020)
- Relatives: Raini Rodriguez (sister)

Rico Rodriguez (born July 31, 1998) is an American actor. He is best known for his role as Manny Delgado on the ABC sitcom Modern Family (2009–2020). He received several Screen Actors Guild Awards for his performance. He has also appeared in numerous other television shows and movies—both as himself and other characters—before, during, and after the show's run, such as Epic Movie, Endgame, El Americano: The Movie, and Nickelodeon's The Substitute and Unfiltered.

== Early life ==
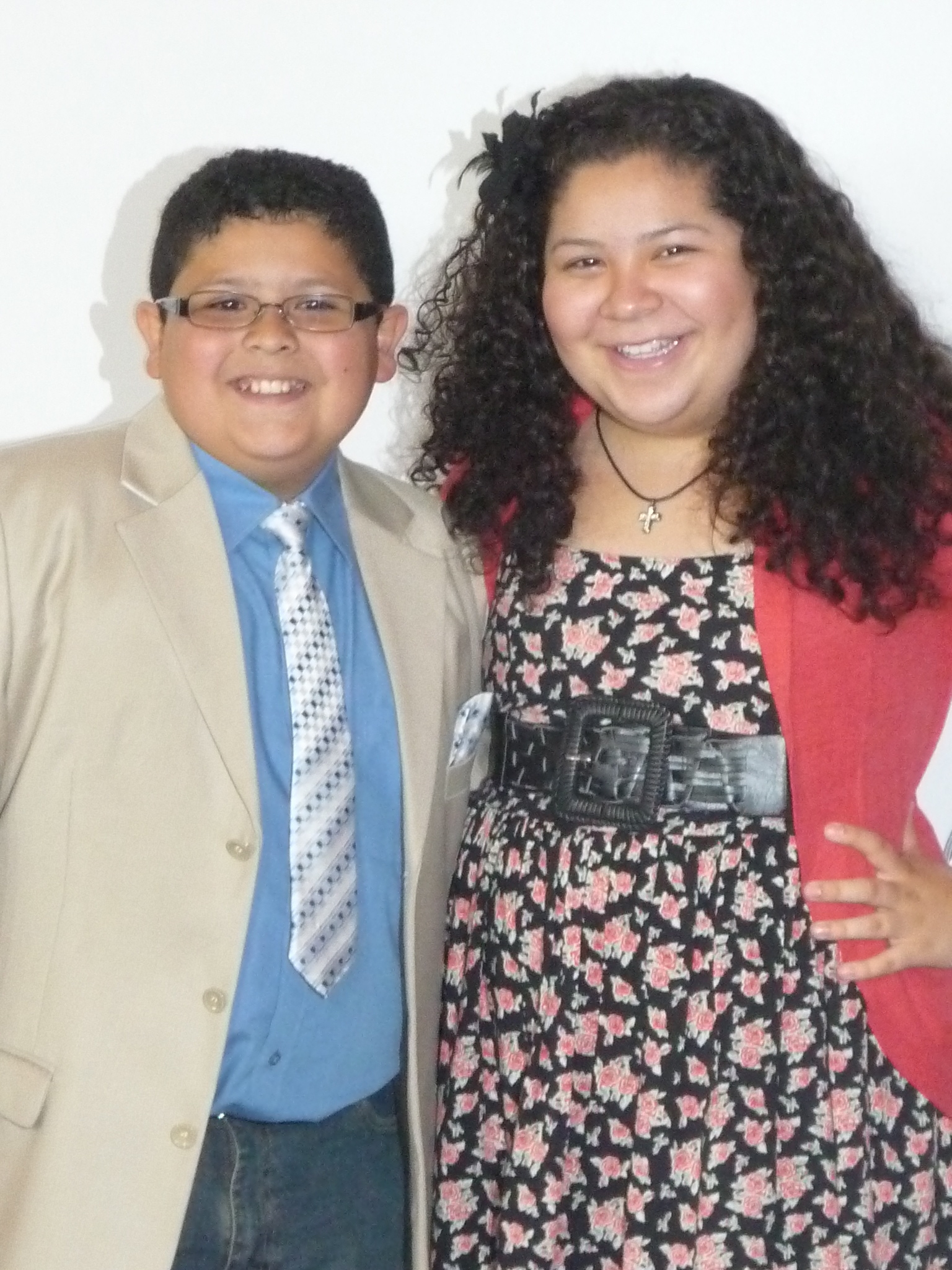
Rodriguez with his sister, Raini, in 2010

Rodriguez was born in Bryan, Texas, the son of Diane and Roy Rodriguez, who owned Rodriguez Tire Service. He has three older siblings; brothers Ray and Roy Jr. and sister Raini Rodriguez, who is also an actress. He is of Mexican descent.

== Career ==
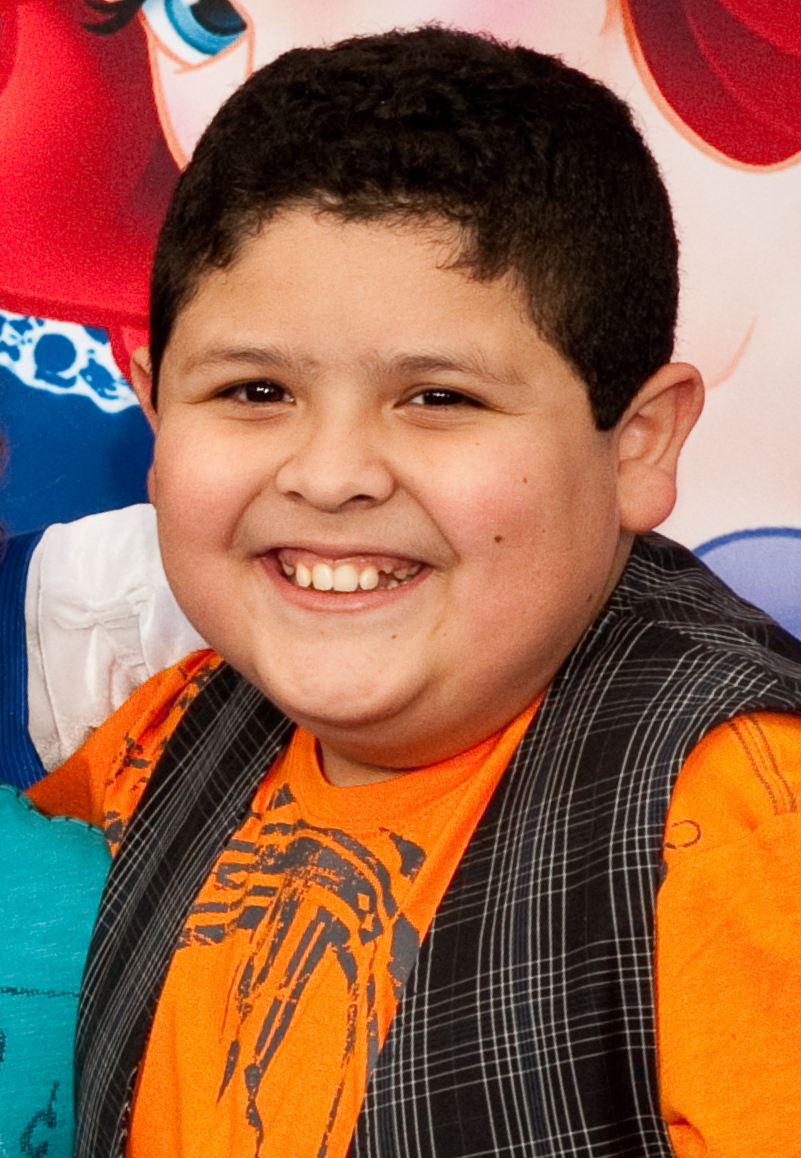
Rodriguez in 2010

At age nine, he played a character in Cory in the House. He later had guest appearances on the series ER, iCarly, Nip/Tuck, and My Name Is Earl.

In September 2009, he began playing Manny Delgado in Modern Family. His role was said to be "crazy hard" to cast by co-creator Steve Levitan. In 2010, he said he is sometimes nothing like Manny, although he also named some similarities between them. Later, in 2016, Rodriguez said he had "grown into the character", finding more in common with him. For the role, Rodriguez and the cast of Modern Family were nominated eight times for the Screen Actors Guild Award for Outstanding Performance by an Ensemble in a Comedy Series, winning four times.

The same year Modern Family was released, he also appeared in a season six episode of NCIS as Travis, a boy who discovers a gun and dead body. He wrote a book that was published in November 2012, titled Reel Life Lessons... So Far. Among other things, he discusses what it was like having Sofía Vergara as his character's mother on Modern Family, writing that she treats him like he were her own son.

In 2015, Rodriguez played the character of Jose in Endgame, a coming-of-age film about a Mexican middle-schooler who joins a chess team. It received a score of 50% on Rotten Tomatoes, based on eight reviews. Rodriguez later voiced a character named Raha in The Lion Guard, part of The Lion King franchise, which ran from 2016 to 2019. The show's cast also included Modern Family co-star Sarah Hyland. In 2016, Rodriguez played a parrot named Cuco in the animated film El Americano: The Movie. Its director, Ricardo Arnaiz, was very pleased with the casting.

Modern Family ended after eleven seasons in April 2020. He announced on Instagram that "words cannot even begin to describe the life-changing experience I have had on this show". Since then, he has made appearances as himself on The Substitute and Unfiltered, both on Nickelodeon.

== Personal life ==
Rodriguez is a Houston Rockets fan. He has described himself as an avid reader.

On March 12, 2017, Rodriguez's father, Roy, died at age 52.

== Filmography ==
=== Film ===
Filmography: Film
Year	Title	Role	Notes
2007	Epic Movie	Chanchito	
2007	Parker	Kid on Playground #2	Short film
2008	Babysitters Beware	Marco	
2009	Opposite Day	Kid Janitor	
2011	The Muppets	Himself	Cameo
2015	Endgame	Jose	
2016	El Americano: The Movie	Cuco	Voice
2025	Sneaks	Ice	Voice

=== Television ===
Filmography: Television
Year	Title	Role	Notes
2006–2007	Jimmy Kimmel Live!	Ice cream kid prankster	10 episodes
2007	Cory in the House	Rico	2 episodes
2007	ER	James	Episode: "Crisis of Conscience"
2007	Nip/Tuck	Kid #1	Episode: "Duke Collins"
2007	iCarly	Boy Riding Toy Horse	Episode: "iRue the Day"
2008	My Name Is Earl	Kid	Episode: "Girl Earl"
2009	NCIS	Travis Buckley	Episode: "Hide and Seek"
2009–2020	Modern Family	Manny Delgado	Main role; 226 episodes
2011	Kick Buttowski: Suburban Daredevil	Luigi Vendetta	Voice, episode: "Luigi Vendetta"
2011	Good Luck Charlie	Leo	Episode: "The Bob Duncan Experience"
2012	R.L. Stine's The Haunting Hour	Chi	Episode: "The Weeping Woman"
2012	Sesame Street	Presenter	1 episode
2012	Mad	Norman, Costumed Boy, Linus Van Pelt	Voice, episode: "Frankenwinnie/ParaMorgan"
2013	Family Guy	Manny Delgado	Episode: "Boopa-dee Bappa-dee"
2014	Cyberchase	Ollie	Voice, episode: "The Cyberchase Movie, Part 1"
2015	Jake and the Never Land Pirates	Snow-Foot	Voice, episode: "The Legendary Snow-Foot!"
2015	Austin & Ally	Benny	Episode: "Burdens & Boynado"
2016	Chopped Junior	Guest Judge	Episode: "Quail Quest"
2016	Victor and Valentino	Valentino	Voice, pilot episode
2016	Nickelodeon's Ultimate Halloween Haunted House	Himself	Main role
2018–2019	The Lion Guard	Raha	Voice, 2 episodes
2018	Double Dare	Himself	Contestant; episode: "Team Rico vs. Team Raini"
2020	The Substitute	Himself	Episode: "Rico & Raini Rodriguez"
2020	Unfiltered	Himself	Episode: "Super Cats & Fierce Ice Cream!"
2024	Bunk'd	Baxter Barca	Episode: "Free Fall and Pickleball"

== Awards and nominations ==
Association	Year	Category	Work	Result
ALMA Award	2011	Favorite TV Actor – Supporting Role in a Comedy	Modern Family	Won
ALMA Award	2012	Favorite TV Actor – Supporting Role in a Comedy	Modern Family	Won
Imagen Award	2010	Best Supporting Actor – Television	Modern Family	Nominated
Imagen Award	2015	Best Young Actor – Television	Modern Family	Won
Screen Actors Guild Award	2009	Outstanding Performance by an Ensemble in a Comedy Series	Modern Family	Nominated
Screen Actors Guild Award	2010	Outstanding Performance by an Ensemble in a Comedy Series	Modern Family	Won
Screen Actors Guild Award	2011	Outstanding Performance by an Ensemble in a Comedy Series	Modern Family	Won
Screen Actors Guild Award	2012	Outstanding Performance by an Ensemble in a Comedy Series	Modern Family	Won
Screen Actors Guild Award	2013	Outstanding Performance by an Ensemble in a Comedy Series	Modern Family	Won
Screen Actors Guild Award	2014	Outstanding Performance by an Ensemble in a Comedy Series	Modern Family	Nominated
Screen Actors Guild Award	2015	Outstanding Performance by an Ensemble in a Comedy Series	Modern Family	Nominated
Screen Actors Guild Award	2016	Outstanding Performance by an Ensemble in a Comedy Series	Modern Family	Nominated
Teen Choice Award	2010	Choice TV: Male Breakout Star	Modern Family	Won
Teen Choice Award	2011	Choice TV: Male Scene Stealer	Modern Family	Nominated
Teen Choice Award	2013	Choice TV: Male Scene Stealer	Modern Family	Nominated
Young Artist Award	2010	Outstanding Young Performers in a TV Series	Modern Family	Won
Young Artist Award	2011	Outstanding Young Performers in a TV Series	Modern Family	Nominated
