= Lifehouse discography =

Pop rock band discography

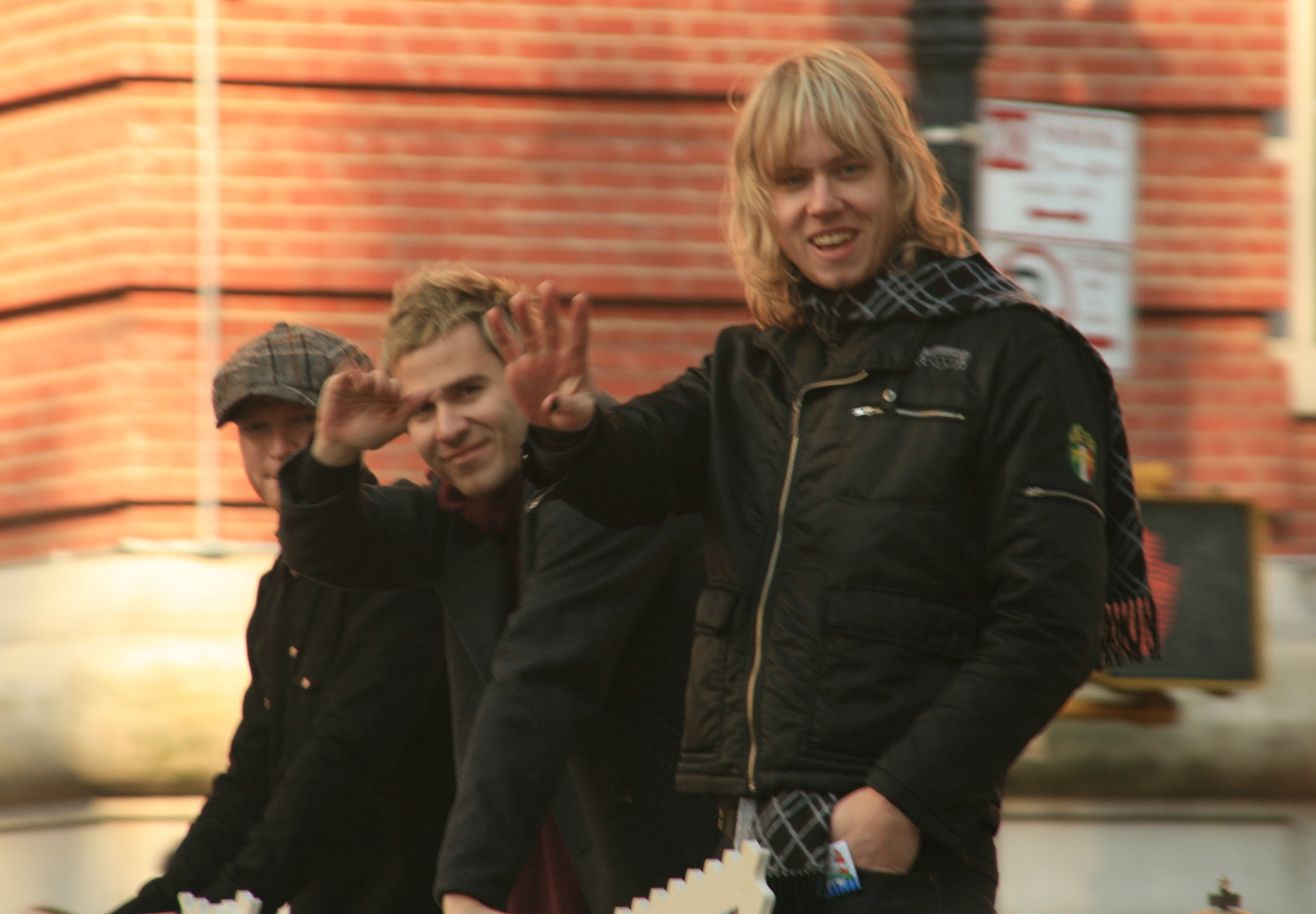
- Lifehouse at Macy's Thanksgiving Day Parade in 2007
- Studio albums: 7
- Extended plays: 3
- Compilation albums: 1
- Singles: 16
- B-sides: 5
- Video albums: 1
- Music videos: 15

American alternative rock band Lifehouse has released seven studio albums, three extended plays, one DVD, and sixteen singles. The band's debut single, "Hanging by a Moment", was named Billboard's song of the year in 2001. After signing to DreamWorks Records in 2000, the band released their debut studio album, No Name Face, which has been certified 2× Platinum by the RIAA.

The band released their latest album Out of the Wasteland on May 26, 2015.

== Albums ==
=== Studio albums ===
Title	Album details	Peak chart positions										Sales	Certifications
Title	Album details	US	AUS	AUT	CAN	DEN	GER	JPN	NLD	NZ	SWE	Sales	Certifications
No Name Face	Released: October 31, 2000; Label: DreamWorks; Formats: CD, cassette	6	10	—	4	2	55	50	20	7	—	US: 2,670,000	RIAA: 2× Platinum; ARIA: Platinum; MC: Platinum; IFPI DEN: Gold; RMNZ: Platinum
Stanley Climbfall	Released: September 17, 2002; Label: DreamWorks; Formats: CD, cassette	7	39	—	9	24	65	44	79	25	47	US: 1,000,000	
Lifehouse	Released: March 22, 2005; Label: Geffen; Formats: CD, digital download	10	95	—	37	—	—	143	—	—	—	US: 960,000	RIAA: Gold; RMNZ: Gold
Who We Are	Released: June 19, 2007; Label: Geffen; Formats: CD, digital download	14	—	—	28	—	—	185	—	—	—	US: 614,000	RIAA: Gold
Smoke & Mirrors	Released: March 2, 2010; Label: Geffen; Formats: CD, digital download	6	75	44	15	—	38	—	40	40	—		
Almería	Released: December 11, 2012; Label: Geffen; Formats: CD, digital download, LP	55	—	—	—	—	—	—	—	—	—		
Out of the Wasteland	Released: May 26, 2015; Label: Ironworks; Formats: CD, digital download	26	96	—	—	—	95	—	82	—	—		
"—" denotes items that did not chart or were not released.

=== Compilation albums ===
Title	Album details
Greatest Hits	Released: July 14, 2017; Label: UME; Formats: CD, digital download, LP

=== DVDs ===
- Everything (2005; compilation of their greatest moments, music videos, hit singles, and live concerts)

== Extended plays ==
Title	EP details
Diff's Lucky Day (as Blyss)	Released: 1999; Label: Independent; Formats: CD
Live Session EP	Released: September 20, 2005; Label: Geffen; Formats: Digital download
Halfway Gone Remixes	Released: April 6, 2010; Label: Geffen; Formats: Digital download
Goodbye Kanan	Released: November 26, 2021; Label: Allswell Records; Formats: Digital download

== Singles ==
Title	Year	Peak chart positions										Certifications	Album
Title	Year	US	US Adult 40	US Pop	AUS	CAN	GER	IRE	NLD	NZ	UK	Certifications	Album
"Hanging by a Moment"	2000	2	1	2	1	—	62	42	31	6	25	ARIA: 2× Platinum; RMNZ: Platinum	No Name Face
"Sick Cycle Carousel"	2001	—	—	—	79	—	93	—	71	47	—		No Name Face
"Breathing"	2001	— (Note: "Breathing" did not enter the Billboard Hot 100, but peaked at number 15 on the Bubbling Under Hot 100 Singles extension chart.)	19	35 (Note: "Breathing" peaked number 35 on the US CHR/Pop Top 50 Radio & Records chart in 2001, but did not enter Billboard's Mainstream Top 40 Airplay chart.)	—	—	—	—	—	—	—		No Name Face
"Spin"	2002	71	13	28	57	—	81	—	93	25	77		Stanley Climbfall
"Take Me Away"	2003	—	22	—	—	—	—	—	—	—	—		Stanley Climbfall
"You and Me"	2005	5	1	4	30	7	—	—	—	39	—	RIAA: Gold; ARIA: Gold; BPI: Gold; RMNZ: 2× Platinum	Lifehouse
"Blind"	2005	—	22	—	—	—	—	—	—	—	—		Lifehouse
"First Time"	2007	26	3	16	78	47	—	—	—	31	—		Who We Are
"Whatever It Takes"	2007	33	3	17	—	—	—	—	—	—	—		Who We Are
"Broken"	2008	83	7	—	—	84	—	—	—	21	—	RIAA: Platinum	Who We Are
"Halfway Gone"	2009	50	2	25	30	67	35	—	64	34	—		Smoke & Mirrors
"All In"	2010	— (Note: "All In" did not enter the Billboard Hot 100, but peaked at number 1 on the Bubbling Under Hot 100 Singles extension chart.)	6	—	71	—	—	—	88	—	—		Smoke & Mirrors
"Falling In"	2011	— (Note: "Falling In" did not enter the Billboard Hot 100, but peaked at number 18 on the Bubbling Under Hot 100 Singles extension chart.)	11	—	—	—	—	—	—	—	—		Smoke & Mirrors
"Between the Raindrops" (featuring Natasha Bedingfield)	2012	79	21	—	—	16	—	—	—	—	—		Almería
"Flight"	2014	—	—	—	—	—	—	—	—	—	—		Out of the Wasteland
"Hurricane"	2015	—	31	—	—	—	—	—	—	—	—		Out of the Wasteland
"Shine Like Gold" (with Switchfoot)	2017	—	—	—	—	—	—	—	—	—	—		Non-album single
"—" denotes a title that did not chart, or was not released in that territory.

=== Promotional singles ===
Title	Year	Peak chart positions		Album
Title	Year	US	CAN	Album
"From Where You Are" (Note: "From Where You Are" is a promotional single used for Allstate Teen Driving commercial and charted due to digital downloads and unsolicited airplay.)	2007	61	—	Smoke & Mirrors
"It Is What It Is"	2010	— (Note: "It Is What It Is" did not enter the Billboard Hot 100, but peaked at number 1 on the Bubbling Under Hot 100 Singles extension chart.)	91	Smoke & Mirrors

== Other songs ==
Song	Year	Album title	Notes
"You Belong to Me"	2001	Shrek: Music from the Original Motion Picture	Jason Wade solo song
"Everything"	2001	Smallville, Vol. 1: The Talon Mix	
"Something"	2001/2002	Last Call with Carson Daly	Tribute to George Harrison
"Everybody Is Someone"	2004	Wicker Park Soundtrack	
"Somewhere Only We Know"	2005	Live on Yahoo Live	
"Good Enough"	2006	The Wild Soundtrack	
"If This Is Goodbye"	2007	Bratz: Motion Picture Soundtrack	B-side from Who We Are recording sessions
"Silent Night"	2007	"Silent Night" single	Song released on iTunes as a holiday single
"Beast of Burden"	2007	Stripped Music Sessions	Tribute to the "godfathers of rock", The Rolling Stones
"Cut & Run"	2021	"Cut & Run" single	
"Dragonflies"	2021	"Dragonflies" single	
"Static"	2021	"Static" single	
"En Rogue"	2021	"En Rogue"	
"Chester Copperpot"	2021	"Chester Copperpot" single	

== Music videos ==
Title	Year	Director(s)
"Hanging by a Moment"	2001	Gavin Bowden
"Sick Cycle Carousel"	2001	N/A
"Breathing"	2002	N/A
"Spin"	2003	Dave Meyers, Dermott Downs
"You and Me"	2005	Bill Yukich
"Blind"	2005	Nigel Dick
"First Time"	2007	Sean Mullens
"Whatever It Takes"	2007	Devin DeHaven
"From Where You Are"	2007	N/A
"Broken"	2008	Frank Borin, Kiefer Sutherland
"Halfway Gone"	2009	Frank Borin
"All In"	2010	Jesse James Dupree
"Between the Raindrops"	2012	Hyperballad
"Flight" (lyric video)	2014	Tom Kirk
"Hurricane"	2015	Tom Kirk, Matt Hayslett
