= Out of the Wasteland =

Studio album by Lifehouse
- Released: May 26, 2015
- Genres: Alternative rock; pop rock; power pop
- Length: 45:42
- Label: Ironworks
- Producers: Jude Cole; Chris "Winnie" Murguia; Bryce Soderberg; Jason Wade; Tommy Walter

Lifehouse chronology
Almería (2012)	Out of the Wasteland (2015)

Singles from Out of the Wasteland
- 1. "Flight" Released: November 18, 2014; 2. "Hurricane" Released: January 27, 2015

Out of the Wasteland is the seventh studio album by American alternative rock band Lifehouse, released on May 26, 2015 by their manager, Jude Cole and actor Kiefer Sutherland's Ironworks record label. It debuted atop Billboard's Independent Albums chart, reached number 26 on the Billboard 200, and was met with generally positive reviews from critics. It was their final album before their hiatus in 2021.

== Background ==
=== Hiatus and solo projects ===
After a lukewarm reception to the band's previous album Almeria, Lifehouse refrained from touring and announced in July 2013 that they chose to leave Interscope Records to spend time focusing on each member's respective solo project. Drummer Rick Woolstenhulme, Jr. began touring with the Goo Goo Dolls; bassist Bryce Soderberg initiated a new band titled KOMOX; lead guitarist Ben Carey left the band to continue work in country rock band Elvis Monroe; and singer/songwriter Jason Wade worked on a solo record titled Paper Cuts.

In his home studio, Wade wrote approximately 70 songs in genres including country and folk over the course of 18 months. Said Wade, "as soon as I wrote "Flight" and "Hurricane," that's when it really started to sink in that I wanted to get the band back together... Those songs started to feel like quintessential Lifehouse tracks. I called the guys up to finish the album together. This is a full circle for us. It really sees us returning to our roots."

=== Writing ===
The majority of the record was written in 2013, however several previously unreleased songs were recorded and included in the final release. "Wish" was written in 2001 and intended to be the final track on the band's 2002 album Stanley Climbfall, before being replaced with "The Beginning"; played on tour in 2011 and recorded with Jim Cox in April 2014, Wade stated that he was glad the song "finally made its way". "Stardust" was a 2013 song written and performed by bassist Bryce Soderberg with his side project KOMOX before being rerecorded as a Lifehouse song. "Central Park" was written in 2007 and originally tracked just prior to the March 2010 release of Smoke & Mirrors, while "Angeline" was written prior to the Almería sessions. "Wish", "Central Park", "Clarity", and "Angeline" were originally slated for Wade's shelved solo album, Paper Cuts, initially set for a 2013 release. "Hourglass" began in the early 1990s as an instrumental piece by producer Jude Cole and film score composer James Newton Howard, before resurfacing during the Out of the Wasteland sessions; Cole suggested Wade write the lyrics and finish the song with Howard.

=== Release ===
Lifehouse released "Flight" independently for digital download on November 18, and announced that a new album would be released in April 2015 titled Seven. On November 20, the band began a contest through online music design agency Creative Allies for fans and graphic designers to create the official album cover. The contest closed on 15 December, and a winner was chosen in early January.

On January 27, Lifehouse revealed through Billboard.com that the album would be titled Out of the Wasteland and released May 19, 2015 under Ironworks Music. Due to the name change, a new album cover was revealed, incorporating elements of the winning design. Along with the track listing for the standard edition of the album, the first radio single "Hurricane" was released for digital download the same day.

On April 7, the album was made available for pre-order in a variety of collector's packages, with the release date moved back one week to May 26. Simultaneously, the acoustic ballad "Wish" was made available for immediate download on iTunes. On May 13, the band acoustically debuted "Yesterday's Son" for Billboard Magazine. The standard edition of the album was featured on Pandora Premieres for full streaming on May 19.

== Promotion ==
Lifehouse announced that they would be opening for Nickelback during the second leg of their No Fixed Address Tour, from June 19 to August 29, 2015. On June 23, they announced that the tour had been cancelled due to the health of Nickelback lead singer Chad Kroeger, and promised a European tour in the fall. The band began a headlining tour in Europe on September 15 with supporting act Raglans, stopped in Pasay, Philippines on October 8, and continued in Australia and New Zealand from October 11 to October 19, 2015. With the departure of former touring guitarist and band member Ben Carey, Steve Stout became Lifehouse' fourth touring member to date.

The band debuted eight new tracks, including "Hurricane", "One for the Pain", "Flight", and "Runaways" as a full band, and "Firing Squad", "Alien", "Yesterday's Son", and "H2O" acoustically. "Angeline", "Wish" and "Stardust" had debuted live in 2011, 2012, and early 2015, respectively. During his solo acoustic set, Wade notably debuted several rare, never-performed Blyss demos from the late 1990s, including "Joshua" and "Eighties".

=== Tour dates ===
Date	City	Venue
September 15, 2015	Amsterdam, Netherlands	Melkweg
September 16, 2015	Groningen, Netherlands	De Oosterpoort
September 17, 2015	Utrecht, Netherlands	TivoliVrendenburg
September 19, 2015	Cologne, Germany	Live Musik Hall Köln
September 20, 2015	Hamburg, Germany	Docks
September 21, 2015	Berlin, Germany	Kesselhaus, Berlin
September 23, 2015	Munich, Germany	Theaterfabrik
September 24, 2015	Frankfurt, Germany	Batschkapp Frankfurt
September 25, 2015	Paris, France	Le Bataclan
September 26, 2015	Paris, France	Les Étoiles
September 28, 2015	Dublin, Ireland	Olympia Theatre
September 29, 2015	Glasgow, United Kingdom	O2 ABC Glasgow
October 1, 2015	London, United Kingdom	O2 Shepherd's Bush Empire
October 2, 2015	Manchester, United Kingdom	Manchester Academy
October 3, 2015	London, United Kingdom	O2 Shepherd's Bush Empire
October 8, 2015	Quezon City, Philippines	MOA Arena, Pasay
October 11, 2015	Perth, Australia	Astor Theatre Perth
October 13, 2015	Hindmarsh, Australia	The Gov
October 14, 2015	Brisbane, Australia	The Tivoli Brisbane
October 15, 2015	Melbourne, Australia	Forum Melbourne
October 16, 2015	Sydney, Australia	Big Top Sydney
October 19, 2015	Auckland, New Zealand	Great Hall, Auckland Town Hall

== Critical reception ==
Professional ratings
Review scores
Source	Rating
AllMusic	3/5 stars
Contact Music	3.5/5 stars
Cross Rhythms	9/10
Jesus Freak Hideout	4/5 stars
Melodic.net	3.5/5 stars
PluggedIn	(Positive)

Out of the Wasteland received positive reviews from music critics. AllMusic's Stephen Thomas Erlewine rates the album three stars out of five and states, "it is an immaculately constructed record, easing between insistent midtempo anthems and power ballads" that "indulge in middle-aged introspection". Alex Lai for Contact Music describes the album as "ultimately a welcome return for the band who provide a number of genuinely worthy songs to the Lifehouse legacy". Michael Weaver, giving the album four stars for Jesus Freak Hideout, writes, "Out of the Wasteland is a fine example of everything good about Lifehouse and anyone would be well-served to get this album today." Rating the album a nine out of ten for Cross Rhythms, Philip Laing writes, "This is overall an impressive return to form by the mainstream stalwarts." PluggedIn's Adam R. Holz comments on Wade's proclamation of returning to a more innocent place for writing, asserting that it "didn’t prevent Lifehouse's latest from overflowing with the kind of mature perspective on life and love, conflict and perseverance that no 17-year-old could ever articulate". Johan Wippsson writes for Melodic.net that 'Firing Squad' and 'Central Park' are "top class where the band feels hungry and 'real' again", concluding that the album "should be considered as one of the greatest in the genre".

== Track listing ==
All tracks produced by Jason Wade, Jude Cole, and Chris "Winnie" Murguia; except "Stardust" produced by Bryce Soderberg and Tommy Walter.

No.	Title	Writer(s)	Length
1.	"Hurricane"	Jason Wade; Jude Cole	3:09
2.	"One for the Pain"	Wade	3:43
3.	"Flight"	Wade	4:17
4.	"Runaways"	Wade; Cole	3:48
5.	"Firing Squad"	Wade; Cole	3:43
6.	"Wish"	Wade	2:42
7.	"Stardust"	Bryce Soderberg; Pelle Hillström	3:56
8.	"Alien"	Wade	2:54
9.	"Central Park"	Wade	4:00
10.	"Hurt This Way"	Wade; Cole; Christian Burghardt	4:09
11.	"Yesterday's Son"	Wade	4:21
12.	"Hourglass"	Wade; Cole; James Newton Howard	5:00
Total length:			45:42

iTunes version
No.	Title	Writer(s)	Length
13.	"Hindsight"	Wade	4:23
14.	"You Are Not Alone"	Wade	4:08
Total length:			54:13

Target deluxe edition
No.	Title	Writer(s)	Length
13.	"Clarity"	Wade	4:26
14.	"Après la Vie"	Wade; Cole	3:15
15.	"Angeline"	Wade	4:16
16.	"Exhale"	Wade; Cole	3:51
Total length:			1:01:27

Collector's edition
No.	Title	Writer(s)	Length
13.	"H2O"	Wade	4:52
Total length:			50:34

== Personnel ==
Lifehouse

- Jason Wade – lead vocals, guitars, piano, co-lead vocals on "Stardust"
- Bryce Soderberg – bass, backing vocals, lead vocals on "Stardust"
- Rick Woolstenhulme, Jr. – drums, percussion

Additional Musicians

- Briana Bandy
- Christian Burghardt
- Gene Cipriano
- Giovanna Clayton
- Jesse Cole
- Jude Cole
- Jim Cox — string arrangements on "Wish"
- Carmel Echols
- Ashley Edner
- Aaron Embry
- Pelle Hillstrom
- Peter Kent
- Mitch Lerner
- Brian Macleod
- Chaz Mason
- Chris "Winnie" Murguia
- Samantha Nelson
- James Newton Howard
- Phil Parlapiano
- Jordan Rogers
- Julie Rogers
- Tommy Walter
- Jordan Whitlock — vocals on "Hourglass"

Production

- Jude Cole, Chris "Winnie" Murguia, Jason Wade — Producers
- Bryce Soderberg and Tommy Walter — Producers on "Stardust"
- Chris Lord-Alge — Mixing
- Florian Ammon — Mixing on "Hindsight", "You Are Not Alone", "Clarity", "Après La Vie", and "Exhale"
- Mitch Lerner — Mixing on "Angeline"
- Florian Ammon, Chris "Winnie" Murguia, Kevin Killen, Mitch Lerner, and Tommy Walter — Engineering
- Keith Armstrong, and Nik Karpen — Additional Engineering
- Ted Jensen — Mastering

== Chart performance ==
Chart (2015)	Peak position
Australian Albums (ARIA)	96
Dutch Albums (Album Top 100)	82
German Albums (Offizielle Top 100)	95
Scottish Albums (Official Charts)	81
UK Independent Albums (Official Charts)	22
US Billboard 200	26
US Independent Albums (Billboard)	1
US Top Rock Albums (Billboard)	3
