= Hurricane (Lifehouse song) =

Single by Lifehouse

from the album Out of the Wasteland
- Released: January 27, 2015
- Recorded: 2014
- Genre: Pop, alternative rock
- Length: 3:09
- Label: Ironworks Music
- Songwriters: Jason Wade, Jude Cole
- Producers: Jude Cole, Lifehouse, Chris Murguia

Lifehouse singles chronology
"Flight'" (2014)	"Hurricane" (2015)

Music video
- "Hurricane" on YouTube

"Hurricane" is a 2015 song by American multi-platinum alternative rock band Lifehouse. It served as the lead radio single off the band's seventh studio album Out of the Wasteland. The song is the first radio single released by the band since "Between the Raindrops" in September 2012 and their subsequent hiatus. It is also the first radio single released by the band under the independent label Ironworks Music.

== Background and release ==
Recorded in mid-2014, Lifehouse lead singer Jason Wade cowrote the track with producer and manager Jude Cole; it marks the fifth consecutive Lifehouse single cowritten with Cole. Produced by the band, Cole, and former Lifehouse guitar tech Chris "Winnie" Murguia, the song made its radio debut on January 18, 2015, and was released worldwide for digital purchase January 27, 2015. The band partnered with iTunes US for their "single of the week" promotion, allowing free legal download of the song for seven days after its release. The first live performance of the song was recorded for iHeart Radio on January 20.

== Composition and critical reception ==
Hurricane is an uptempo pop rock song. It features electric guitars, electric bass, rock drums, and synthesizers. Wade said of the track, "'Hurricane' started as a catchy up-tempo pop song and then transformed into this electric, energetic rock song that was very reminiscent of our first album...I feel like it is the backbone of the record, and was the catalyst that brought our band back around full circle". At 3:09, it is the shortest single released by the band to date.

== Music video ==
Background

A music video was filmed on December 20, 2014; directed by Thomas Kirk with Matt Hayslett as the cinematographer, it was unveiled by Billboard.com alongside the song. According to Wade, "[t]he video depicts two people working out their problems in a scene of chaos, which takes place in a prison. A fitting setting since the song is about a refusal to give up on someone no matter how turbulent life can get sometimes."

Synopsis

The video begins with the band playing the song in a jail cell, as a woman is walked through the jail to the interrogation room. After arguing with her lover, a police officer moves them to a jail cell adjacent to the band's, where they begin to fight. As an inmate locks an officer to a cell, all cell doors are unlocked and opened, and the inmates begin to escape, ravaging through file cabinets and destroying their files. Officers attempt to stop them, while the two lovers calm down and embrace in their cell.

== Credits and personnel ==
- Songwriting - Jason Wade, Jude Cole
- Production - Jude Cole, Lifehouse, Chris Murguia

== Charts ==
Chart (2015)	Peak position
US Adult Contemporary (Mediabase)	27
US Hot Adult Contemporary (Mediabase)	30
US Adult Pop Songs (Billboard)	31
