= Almería (album) =

Studio album by Lifehouse
- Released: December 11, 2012
- Recorded: Box Canyon, California
- Genre: Southern rock; acoustic rock; country rock
- Length: 39:21
- Label: Geffen
- Producer: Jude Cole

Lifehouse chronology
Smoke & Mirrors (2010)	Almería (2012)	Out of the Wasteland (2015)

Singles from Almería
- 1. "Between the Raindrops" Released: September 11, 2012

Almería is the sixth studio album by American alternative rock band Lifehouse, released on December 11, 2012, by Geffen Records. The title refers to the Spanish city of Almería, where many classic western films were filmed. The album was produced by Jude Cole, who has worked with Lifehouse on previous albums. The lead single off the album was released in September, and is titled "Between the Raindrops", a duet with British pop singer Natasha Bedingfield.

== Background ==
Almería has a different sound than the previous work of Lifehouse, with lead singer Jason Wade telling Billboard that "We just knew we had to go back to the drawing board and try something new. We felt like our sound needed to evolve and to change."

== Critical reception ==
Professional ratings
Review scores
Source	Rating
AllMusic (Stephen Thomas Erlewine)	3.5/5 stars
CCM Magazine (Andy Argyrakis)	4/5 stars
Entertainment Weekly (Grady Smith)	B
Evigshed Magazine (Sylvie Lesas)	5/5 stars
Jesus Freak Hideout (Bert Gangl) (Michael Weaver)	4/5 stars
Melodic.net (Johan Wippsson)	2/5 stars
Under The Gun Review	7/10

AllMusic's Stephen Thomas Erlewine wrote that "On the whole, Lifehouse have gotten lighter with age. They no longer are determined to plumb the depths of their soul; they're happy to offer slight, meaningful textures to their introspective rockers. The cumulative effect is welcoming: they're brighter, happier, and lighter than before, qualities that make for one of their better records."

CCM Magazine's Andy Argyrakis wrote that "Lifehouse cements its longevity on Almería by incorporating a bluesy, roots rockin' emphasis within its already sturdy modern rock framework. The results range from the catchy ear candy of Natasha Bedingfield duet, 'Between the Raindrops' and smoldering Peter Frampton tag team 'Right Back Home,' all the while showcasing front man Jason Wade's pensive but relatable lyrics."

Entertainment Weekly's Grady Smith wrote that "These survivors of the early-aughts soft-rock matrix dip into blues and even country on their sixth disc, but it all suffers from a general blandness."

Evigshed Magazine's Sylvie Lesas wrote that the album "is ambitious and extremely impressive and mainly, lives up to your expectations from Lifehouse."

Jesus Freak Hideout's Bert Gangl wrote that "All too often, when artists branch out musically or lyrically, the albums that result are scattershot, incoherent affairs that leave the bulk of those who hear them more confused than impressed. Ironically enough, though, while the Almería record is easily the quartet's most eclectic and wide-ranging project to date, it also happens to be its most focused – thanks, in large part, to the aforementioned undercurrent of optimism and resolve that ties its disparate songs so neatly together. In the wildly successful inaugural Lifehouse single, Wade cried out in a plaintive voice that he was "desperate for changing" and "starving for truth." Twelve years and five albums later, it looks as if he might have finally found both."

Jesus Freak Hideout's Michael Weaver wrote that "This isn't a record you've heard from Lifehouse in the past and it's not one you should pass up. It may take a listen or two to adjust to the sound of Almería, but this is the first Lifehouse album worth getting excited about in a while."

Melodic.net's Johan Wippson wrote that "So of course it will sound strange when you mix organic rock with over-produced pop on the same album. Almería was a good idea, but as big Lifehouse fan, I regret to say that this is the band's weakest album to date."

== Track listings ==
All songs produced by Jude Cole and Lifehouse.

No.	Title	Writer(s)	Length
1.	"Gotta Be Tonight"	Jason Wade	3:11
2.	"Between the Raindrops" (featuring Natasha Bedingfield)	Wade; Jude Cole; Jacob Kasher	4:45
3.	"Nobody Listen"	Wade; Cole	3:40
4.	"Moveonday"	Wade; Cole	4:03
5.	"Slow Motion"	Wade; Cole	5:22
6.	"Only You're the One"	Wade; Cole	3:29
7.	"Where I Come From"	Wade	3:52
8.	"Right Back Home" (featuring Peter Frampton and Charles Jones)	Wade; Bryce Soderberg; Rick Woolstenhulme, Jr.; Cole	3:58
9.	"Barricade"	Wade; Cole	3:04
10.	"Aftermath"	Wade	3:47
Total length:			39:21

Deluxe Version
No.	Title	Writer(s)	Length
11.	"Lady Day"	Wade	3:37
12.	"Pins & Needles"	Wade	3:03
13.	"Rolling Off the Stone"	Wade	3:33

iTunes Deluxe Version
No.	Title	Writer(s)	Length
14.	"Always Somewhere Close"	Wade; Soderberg; Woolstenhulme Jr.; Cole	3:00

== Personnel ==
Lifehouse

- Jason Wade – lead vocals, rhythm guitar
- Rick Woolstenhulme – drums, percussion
- Bryce Soderberg – bass, backing vocals
- Ben Carey – lead guitar, backing vocals

Additional musicians

- Natasha Bedingfield – vocals on "Between the Raindrops"
- Peter Frampton – vocals on "Right Back Home"
- Charles Jones – vocals on "Right Back Home"
- Patrick Leonard — organ on "Rolling Off the Stone"
- Dan Higgins — saxophone & saxophone solo on "Rolling Off the Stone"

Production

- Jude Cole – production

== Charts ==
=== Album ===
Chart (2012)	Peak position
US Billboard 200	55
US Top Rock Albums (Billboard)	12
US Digital Albums (Billboard)	17
