= Raglans =

Irish indie rock band (formed 2011)

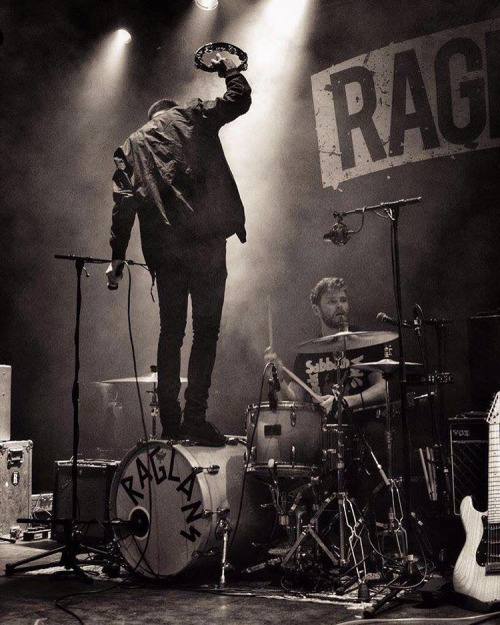
- Stephen Kelly and Conn O'Ruanaidh of Raglans performing in Bergen op Zoom in 2016

Background information
- Origin: Dublin, Ireland
- Genres: Rock, indie rock, punk rock
- Years active: 2011–present
- Labels: Independent Records Ltd., Motor Music, Maybe Madness
- Members: Stephen Kelly; Rhos Horan; Conn O'Ruanaidh
- Past members: Liam Morrow; Sean O'Brien; Dan O'Shaughnessy
- Website: www.facebook.com/Raglans/

Raglans are an Irish indie rock band based in Dublin. Officially formed in 2011, they consist of Stephen Kelly, Conn O'Ruanaidh and Rhos Horan. Their self-titled debut album was released in March 2014 through IRL Records, and reached no.5 in the Irish Album Chart and no.1 in the Irish Indie Chart.

They have toured extensively worldwide, as well as providing support to bands such as The Strypes, Twin Atlantic, Haim, The Courteeners, The Fray, The Libertines and Lifehouse.

Raglans debut album and live shows have both received critical acclaim.

In March 2016 Raglans began recording the follow-up to their 2014 debut album in Los Angeles with Chris Murguia and Jason Wade of Lifehouse. The record was released in October 2016, before they went for another tour.

== Discography ==
=== Studio albums ===
Title	Album details	Peak chart positions
Title	Album details	IRL
Raglans	Released: 21 March 2014; Label: Independent Records Ltd., Motor Music; Formats: CD, digital download	5
