= Smoke & Mirrors (Lifehouse album) =

Studio album by Lifehouse
- Released: March 2, 2010
- Recorded: 2008–2009
- Genre: Alternative rock; power pop; post-grunge
- Length: 45:00
- Label: Geffen
- Producer: Jude Cole; Lifehouse; Kevin Rudolf; Florian Ammon

Lifehouse chronology
Who We Are (2007)	Smoke & Mirrors (2010)	Almería (2012)

Singles from Smoke & Mirrors
- 1. "Halfway Gone" Released: October 26, 2009; 2. "All In" Released: May 18, 2010

Smoke & Mirrors is the fifth studio album by American alternative rock band Lifehouse. It was released on March 2, 2010, by Geffen Records. Lifehouse began to work on the album with record producer Jude Cole in the fall of 2008 at Cole's Ironworks Studio. The band collaborated with American singer-songwriter Kevin Rudolf and Chris Daughtry of the band Daughtry while working on the album.

The album received mixed reviews from critics, and peaked at number six on the Billboard 200, selling 54,000 copies in its first week. It became the fourth highest debut album on the chart for the week of March 20, 2010. It also debuted at number 15 on the Canadian Albums Chart, which became its peak on the chart.

The album's lead single, "Halfway Gone", was released October 26, 2009, charting on several Billboard charts including Billboard's Hot 100, Adult Contemporary, Digital Songs, Hot Dance Club Songs, Pop Songs, and Radio Songs charts.

== Background ==
Lifehouse began working on the album with record producer Jude Cole in the fall of 2008, after the band had come off of the tour that supported their fourth studio album, Who We Are. The band worked on Smoke & Mirrors for over a year, recording thirty-five tracks, before settling on the twelve tracks that appear on the album. During this time, the band collaborated with American singer-songwriter Kevin Rudolf on the album's lead single, "Halfway Gone" and with Daughtry's lead singer Chris Daughtry on the song "Had Enough". In an interview with Billboard, Rudolf said, "I chose [to do] 'Halfway Gone' because Jason Wade is such a great writer, great singer, and great artist."

In an interview with They Will Rock You, when asked about recording the song "Smoke & Mirrors", lead Lifehouse percussionist Rick Woolstenhulme, Jr. said:

"The very first track that we recorded for the album is the track called Smoke & Mirrors which ended up being the name of the album. That song is very Americana and almost Petty-esque in a way. For that song we literally came from the road and headed right into the studio and that was the first song that was brought to the table. It was cut in two or three takes."

== Critical reception ==
Professional ratings
Review scores
Source	Rating
Allmusic	2.5/5 stars
Alternative Addiction	4.5/5 stars
Jesus Freak Hideout	3.5/5 stars
Melodic.net	(Deluxe)
Sputnikmusic	3/5 stars
The Tune	3/5 stars

Smoke & Mirrors received mixed reviews from critics. Stephen Thomas Erlewine of Allmusic gave a mixed review of the album, calling it ingratiating, but also commented on how the album would "never [form] anything amounting to any identity."

== Commercial performance ==
In the United States, the album debuted at number six on the Billboard 200, which became its peak on the chart. It sold 54,000 copies in its first week, and became Lifehouse's fourth studio album to chart in the top ten. The album remained on the chart for 20 consecutive weeks.

== Track listing ==
No.	Title	Writer(s)	Producer(s)	Length
1.	"All In"	Jason Wade; Jude Cole	Cole; Lifehouse	3:54
2.	"Nerve Damage"	Wade; Cole	Cole; Lifehouse	4:27
3.	"Had Enough" (feat. Chris Daughtry)	Wade; Daughtry; Richard Marx	Cole; Lifehouse	3:45
4.	"Halfway Gone"	Wade; Cole; Kevin Rudolf; Jacob Kasher	Cole; Lifehouse	3:14
5.	"It Is What It Is"	Wade; Cole	Cole; Lifehouse	3:20
6.	"From Where You Are"	Wade	Cole; Lifehouse	3:01
7.	"Smoke & Mirrors"	Wade; Cole	Cole; Lifehouse	4:25
8.	"Falling In"	Wade; Cole; Rudolf; Kasher	Cole; Rudolf	3:44
9.	"Wrecking Ball"	Wade; Cole; Bryce Soderberg; Rick Woolstenhulme, Jr.	Cole; Lifehouse	4:24
10.	"Here Tomorrow Gone Today"	Wade; Cole	Cole; Florian Ammon	3:09
11.	"By Your Side"	Wade; Cole	Cole; Lifehouse	4:08
12.	"In Your Skin"	Wade; Cole	Cole; Lifehouse	3:24
Total length:				45:00

Deluxe edition
No.	Title	Writer(s)	Producer(s)	Length
13.	"All That I'm Asking For"	Wade; Cole	Cole; Patrick Leonard	3:55
14.	"Crash and Burn"	Wade	Cole; Lifehouse	4:15
15.	"Everything" (live in-studio version)	Wade	Cole; Lifehouse	6:26
16.	"Near Life Experience"	Wade	Cole; Lifehouse	4:11
17.	"Don't Wake Me When It's Over" (iTunes exclusive)	Wade; Cole	Cole; Lifehouse	3:26
18.	"Best of Me (What's Left of Me)" (Amazon exclusive)	Wade; Cole; Marx		3:05
19.	"Halfway Gone" (Demolition Crew remix)			3:35
Total length:				64:09

== Personnel ==
Adapted from the album credits.

=== Lifehouse ===
- Jason Wade – lead vocals, rhythm guitar, piano on "Don't Wake Me When It's Over"
- Rick Woolstenhulme, Jr. – drums, percussion
- Bryce Soderberg – bass guitar, backing vocals, lead vocals on "Wrecking Ball", co-lead vocals on “Here Tomorrow, Gone Today”
- Ben Carey – lead guitar on "Falling In", "Everything" and "Near Life Experience"

=== Additional musicians ===
- Chris Daughtry – backing vocals on "Had Enough"
- Mitch Lerner – piano on "All In", "Nerve Damage", "It Is What It Is" and "In Your Skin"
- Chris Murguia – guitars, Hammond organ on "Nerve Damage" and "Smoke & Mirrors", piano on "It Is What It Is", backing vocals on "Here Tomorrow Gone Today"
- Jude Cole – guitars, backing vocals, synthesizer, keyboard on "Had Enough", bass on "From Where You Are"
- Patrick Leonard – piano, synthesizer, synth bass, each for "All That I'm Asking For"
- Florian Ammon – synthesizer on ""Everything" and "Near Life Experience"
- Sonus Quartet – strings on "All That I'm Asking For"

=== Production ===
- Jude Cole – Record producer
- Chris Lord-Alge – Mixing
- Serban Ghenea – Mixing on "All In", Halfway Gone, "Falling In", "By Your Side"
- Florian Ammon – Mixing on "Here Tomorrow Gone Today", "All That I'm Asking For", "Crash and Burn", "Everything", "Near Life Experience
- Greg Calbi – Mastering

== Charts ==
Chart performance for Smoke & Mirrors
Chart (2010)	Peak position
Australian Albums (ARIA)	75
Austrian Albums (Ö3 Austria)	44
Canadian Albums (Billboard)	15
Dutch Albums (Album Top 100)	40
German Albums (Offizielle Top 100)	38
New Zealand Albums (RMNZ)	40
US Billboard 200	6
