= Flight (song) =

Single by Lifehouse

from the album Out of the Wasteland
- Released: November 18, 2014
- Recorded: 2014
- Genre: Pop • alternative rock • Pop rock • Soft rock
- Length: 4:17
- Label: Jason Wade Music, Ironworks Music
- Songwriter: Jason Wade

Lifehouse singles chronology
"Between the Raindrops'" (2012)	"Flight" (2014)	"Hurricane" (2015)

Music video
- "Flight" on YouTube

"Flight" is a 2014 song by American alternative rock band Lifehouse. Written by lead singer Jason Wade, the track served as a preview of the band's album Out of the Wasteland, released in May 2015. It was the first new recording released by the band since their hiatus in July 2013.

== Background and composition ==
Unlike previous Lifehouse singles, the song is a piano ballad. It begins solely with a simple chord and melody set before growing to include drums, bass, and electric guitar. After the second chorus, it builds to a climactic crescendo. Wade had previously stated that writing on the piano was a skill he had wanted to develop.

== Music video ==
A lyric video, directed by Thomas Kirk, was released alongside the song, featuring actress TL Forsberg. The clip was filmed in one single shot with no cut, and weaves in and around an abandoned diner and motel in the desert in point of view before focusing on a woman sitting on a bed and communicating the song's closing lyrics to the camera using sign language.
