= Ben Carey =

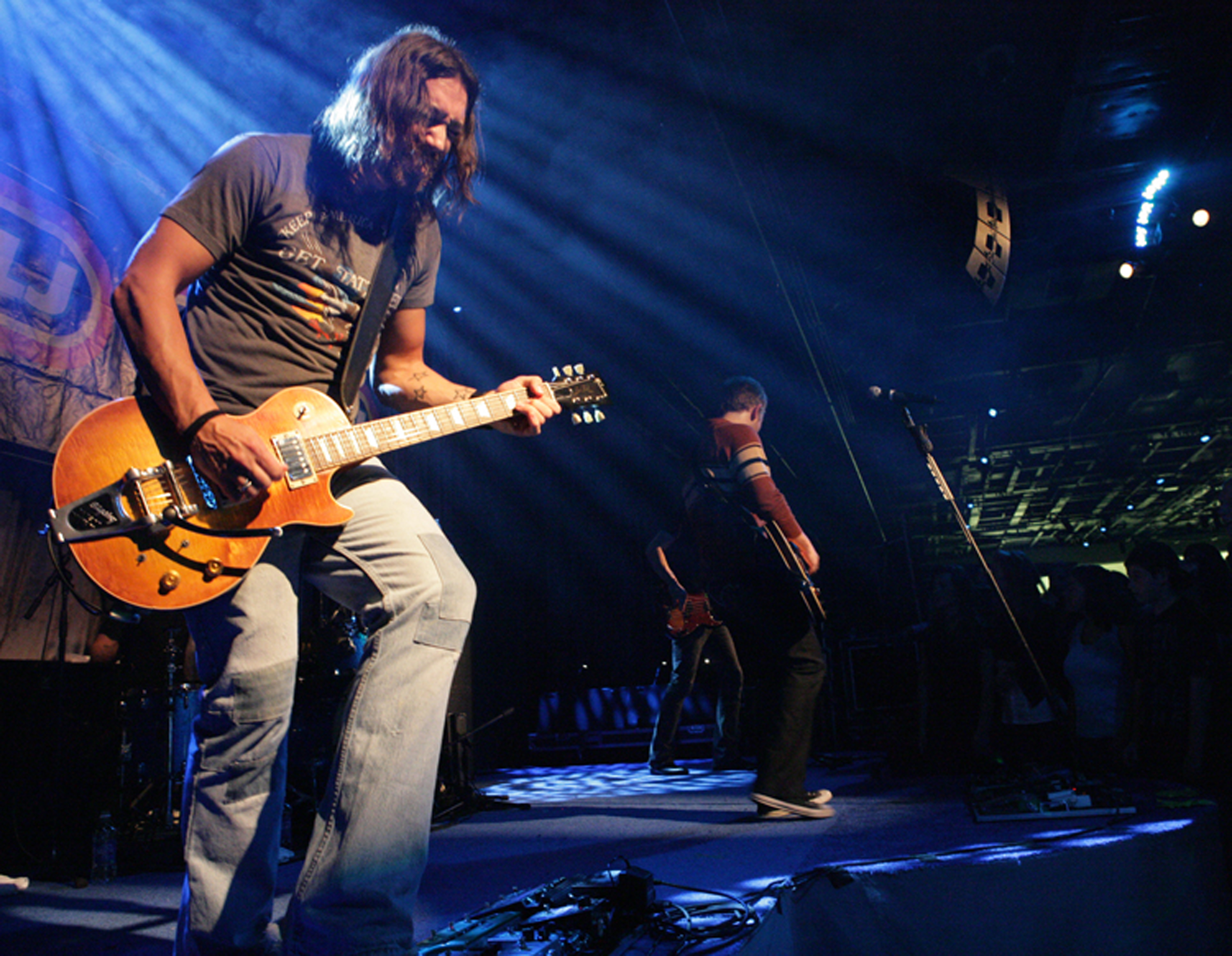

Background information
- Born: 10 January 1975 (age 50); Warburton, Victoria, Australia
- Occupations: Musician, actor
- Instrument: Guitar

Ben Carey (born 10 January 1975 in Warburton, Victoria, Australia) is an Australian guitarist. He played with bands such as Savage Garden, Tal Bachman, and Lifehouse. He also performed with Elvis Monroe with members from bands like Matchbox Twenty.

== Career ==
From 1998 to 2000 Carey joined Savage Garden on their Affirmation World Tour as band guitarist, performing "I Knew I Loved You", "Affirmation", "Crash & Burn", and other songs.

For a short period of time, he played in the band Tal Bachman and is featured in the video for the hit single "She's So High".

In 2004, Carey joined Lifehouse after the departure of Sean Woolstenhulme, brother of drummer Rick Woolstenhulme, Jr. In 2009, Lifehouse announced that Carey was an official member, stating he was "family to us". He featured in the band's videos "Broken", "Halfway Gone", "All In" and "Between the Raindrops" in 2012. In December 2014, the band announced that Carey would leave to focus on other projects, such as his band Elvis Monroe.

Elvis Monroe released one single; "Blue Collar Man", which was the theme song for season 3 of TV show "Vegas Rat Rods".
