= List of Billboard Adult Contemporary number ones of 2006 =

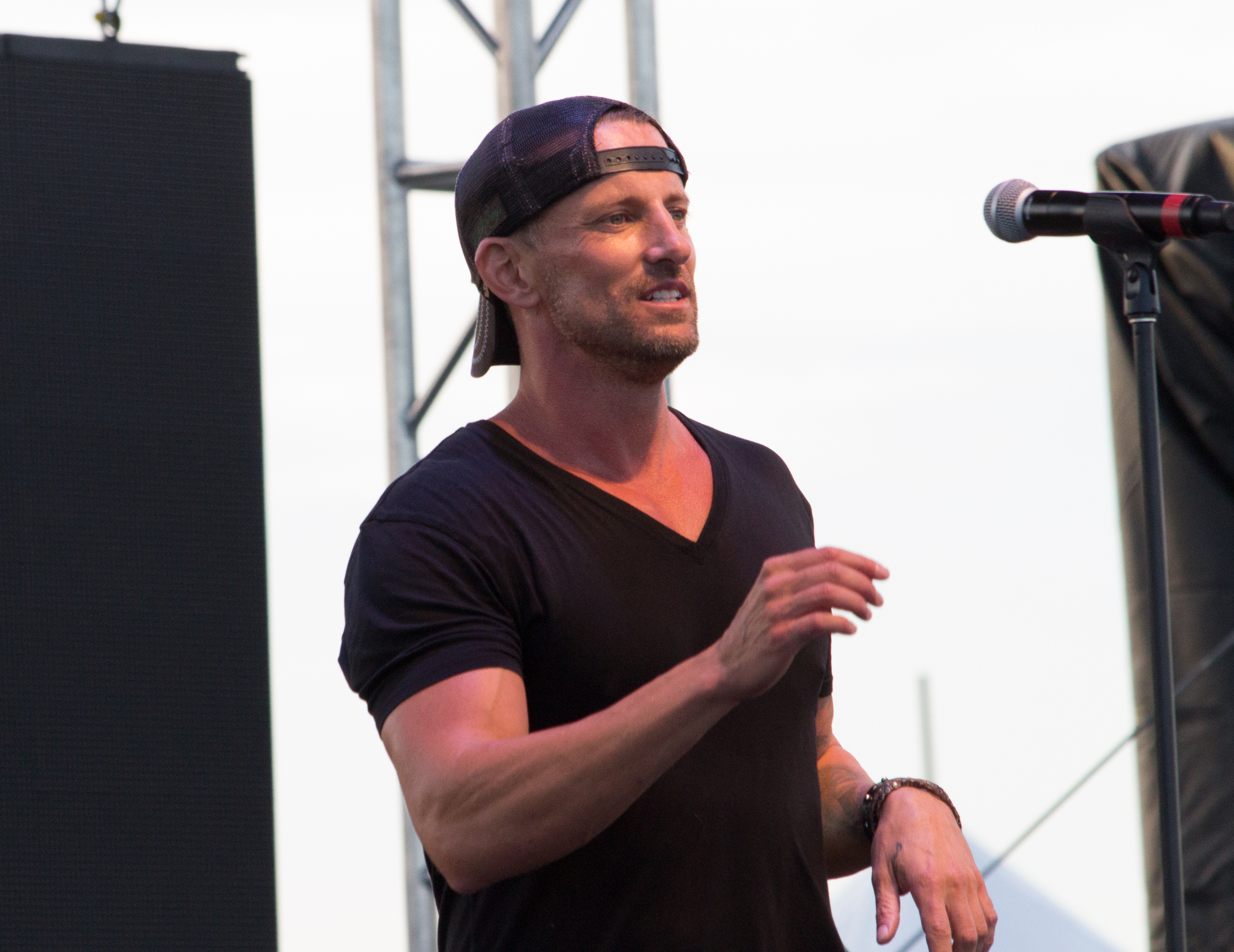
Daniel Powter spent 18 consecutive weeks at number one with "Bad Day".

Adult Contemporary is a chart published by Billboard ranking the top-performing songs in the United States in the adult contemporary music (AC) market. In 2006, 9 different songs topped the chart in 52 issues of the magazine, based on weekly airplay data from radio stations compiled by Nielsen Broadcast Data Systems.

In the first issue of Billboard of the new year, the number one song was "Up on the Housetop" by Kimberley Locke, which was in its fourth week atop the chart. Canadian singer Daniel Powter's song "Bad Day" had the longest unbroken run of the year at number one, spending consecutive 18 weeks atop the chart, and also had the highest total number of weeks in the top spot, with 19 non-consecutive weeks in the peak position. The song had been a major hit in Europe in 2005, but did not achieve success in the United States until the following year, after its use in the fifth season of the TV talent show American Idol to accompany video packages spotlighting each eliminated contestant. Powter's song was one of only two AC number ones of 2006 to also top Billboard's all-genre chart, the Hot 100, but the singer failed to achieve further success and came to be regarded as a one-hit wonder. The same label has been attached to British singer James Blunt, whose song "You're Beautiful" was the other track to top both charts in 2006.

In the fall, country music group Rascal Flatts topped the AC chart for the first time with its version of the song "What Hurts the Most". It was the trio's fifth Hot Country Songs chart-topper, but only its second song to crossover to the AC chart and the first to achieve sufficient spins on adult contemporary radio to top the listing. The final two AC number ones of the year were both Christmas-themed, continuing a theme which began in the early 21st century, when stations of the relevant format began devoting their playlists exclusively to seasonal songs in December. In the issue of Billboard dated December 23, Kimberley Locke achieved her second number one of the year with her version of "Jingle Bells", making her the only artist to appear at number one with two different songs in 2006. The following week Hall & Oates took the top spot with their recording of the Christmas carol "It Came Upon a Midnight Clear", which was the final number one of the year.

== Chart history ==
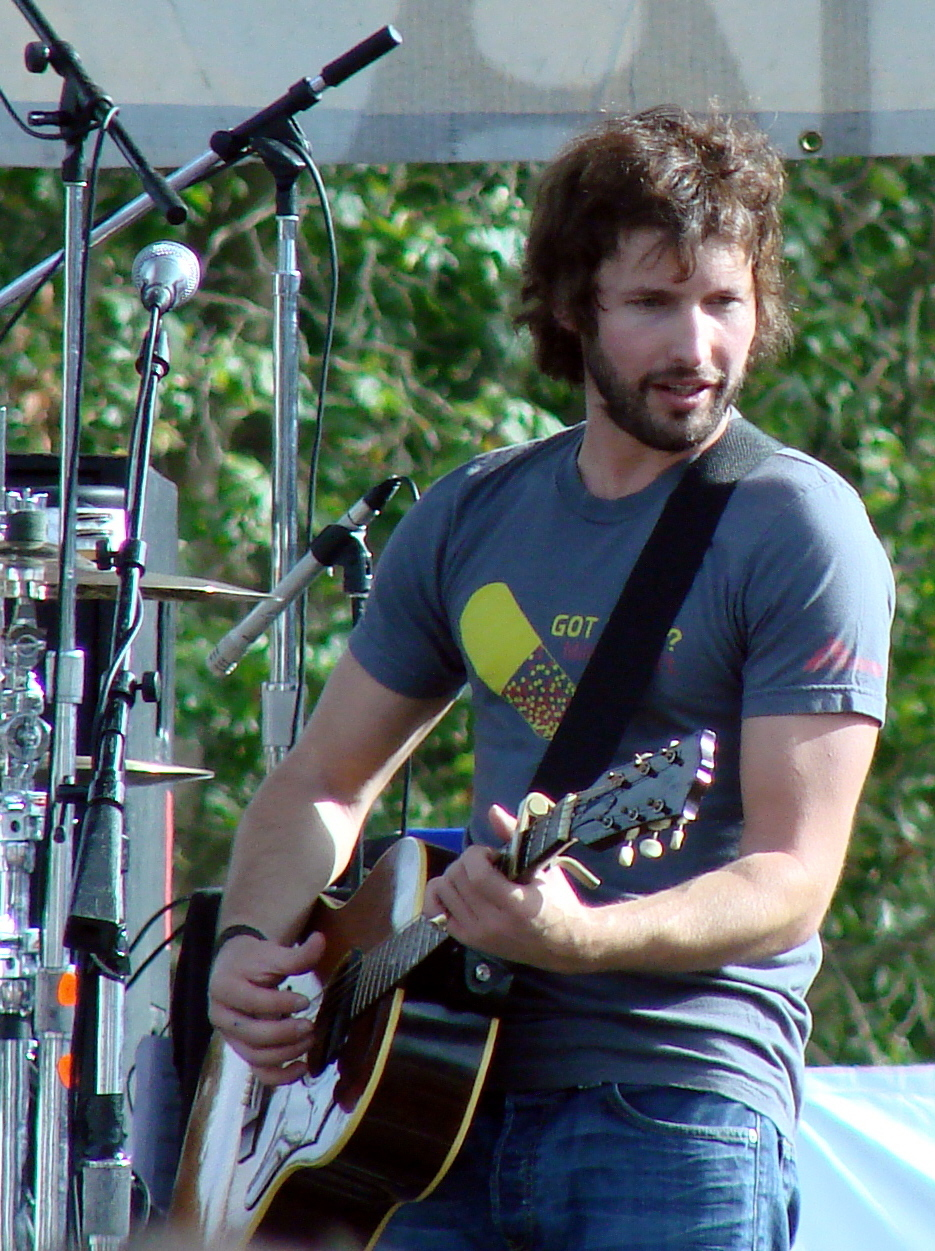
British singer James Blunt topped the chart with "You're Beautiful".

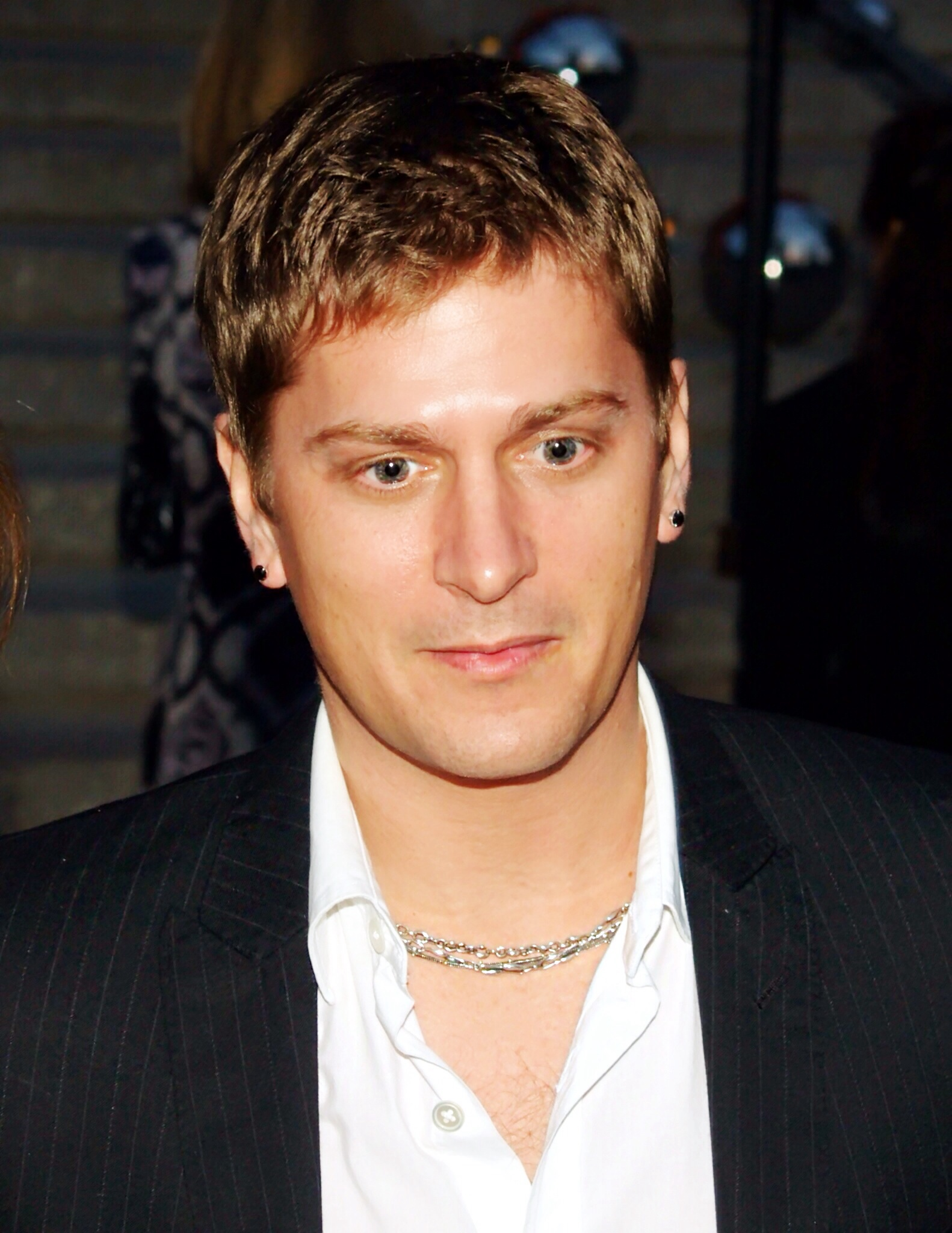
Rob Thomas’s song “Lonely No More” which spent one week at number one.

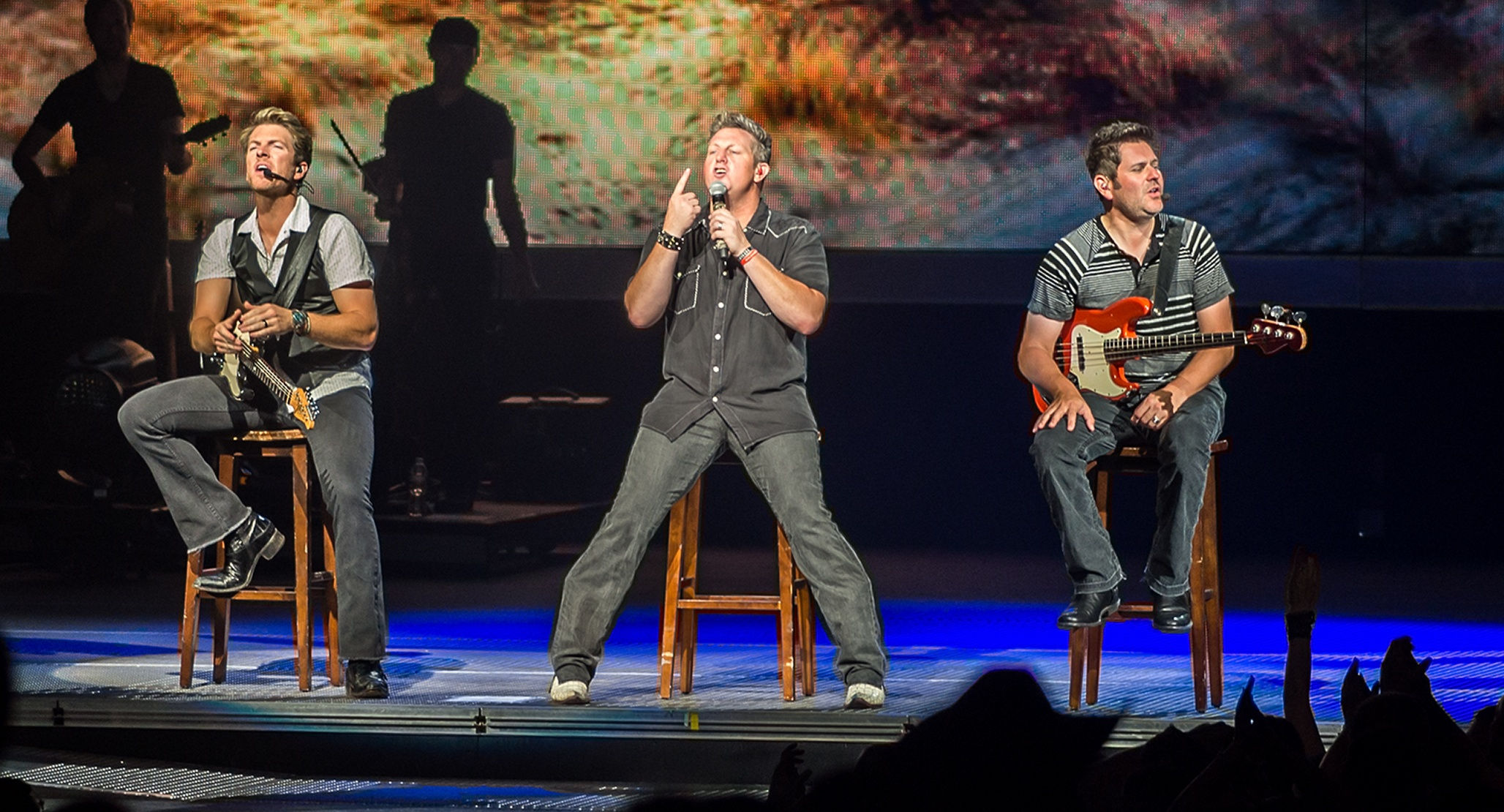
Rascal Flatts spent four weeks at number one with their cover of "What Hurts The Most".

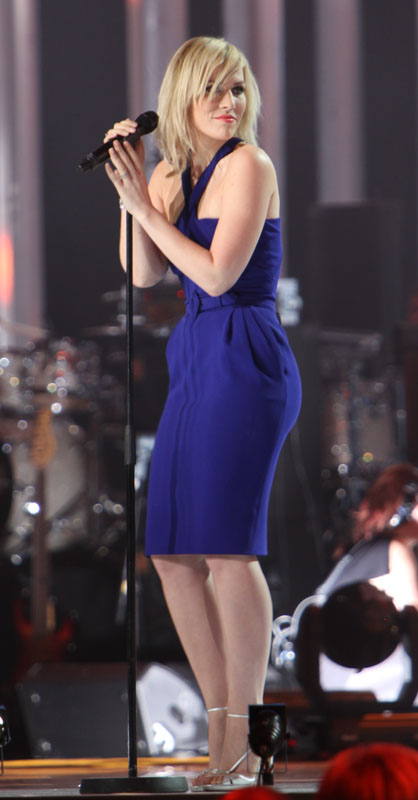
Natasha Bedingfield reached number one with "Unwritten".

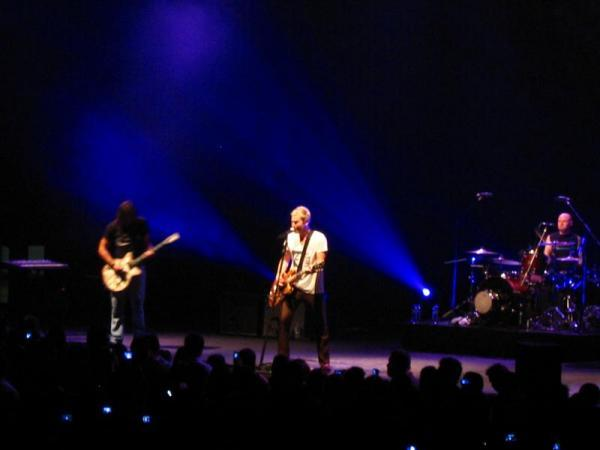
"You and Me" was a number-one song for the American alternative rock band Lifehouse.

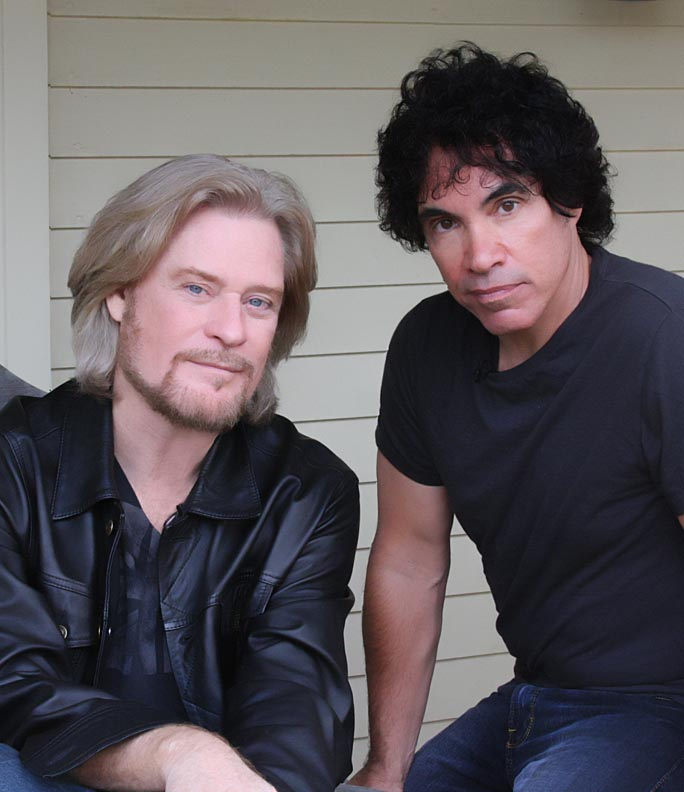
Hall & Oates ended the year at number one.

Key
†	Indicates best-performing AC song of 2006

Issue date	Title	Artist(s)	Ref.
January 7	"Up on the Housetop"	Kimberley Locke	
January 14	"Lonely No More"	Rob Thomas	
January 21	"You and Me"	Lifehouse	
January 28	"You and Me"	Lifehouse	
February 4	"You and Me"	Lifehouse	
February 11	"You and Me"	Lifehouse	
February 18	"You and Me"	Lifehouse	
February 25	"You and Me"	Lifehouse	
March 4	"You and Me"	Lifehouse	
March 11	"You and Me"	Lifehouse	
March 18	"You're Beautiful" †	James Blunt	
March 25	"You're Beautiful" †	James Blunt	
April 1	"You're Beautiful" †	James Blunt	
April 8	"You're Beautiful" †	James Blunt	
April 15	"You and Me"	Lifehouse	
April 22	"You're Beautiful" †	James Blunt	
April 29	"You're Beautiful" †	James Blunt	
May 6	"You're Beautiful" †	James Blunt	
May 13	"Bad Day"	Daniel Powter	
May 20	"Bad Day"	Daniel Powter	
May 27	"Bad Day"	Daniel Powter	
June 3	"Bad Day"	Daniel Powter	
June 10	"Bad Day"	Daniel Powter	
June 17	"Bad Day"	Daniel Powter	
June 24	"Bad Day"	Daniel Powter	
July 1	"Bad Day"	Daniel Powter	
July 8	"Bad Day"	Daniel Powter	
July 15	"Bad Day"	Daniel Powter	
July 22	"Bad Day"	Daniel Powter	
July 29	"Bad Day"	Daniel Powter	
August 5	"Bad Day"	Daniel Powter	
August 12	"Bad Day"	Daniel Powter	
August 19	"Bad Day"	Daniel Powter	
August 26	"Bad Day"	Daniel Powter	
September 2	"Bad Day"	Daniel Powter	
September 9	"Bad Day"	Daniel Powter	
September 16	"Unwritten"	Natasha Bedingfield	
September 23	"Unwritten"	Natasha Bedingfield	
September 30	"Unwritten"	Natasha Bedingfield	
October 7	"Unwritten"	Natasha Bedingfield	
October 14	"Unwritten"	Natasha Bedingfield	
October 21	"Bad Day"	Daniel Powter	
October 28	"Unwritten"	Natasha Bedingfield	
November 4	"Unwritten"	Natasha Bedingfield	
November 11	"Unwritten"	Natasha Bedingfield	
November 18	"What Hurts the Most"	Rascal Flatts	
November 25	"Unwritten"	Natasha Bedingfield	
December 2	"What Hurts the Most"	Rascal Flatts	
December 9	"What Hurts the Most"	Rascal Flatts	
December 16	"What Hurts the Most"	Rascal Flatts	
December 23	"Jingle Bells"	Kimberley Locke	
December 30	"It Came Upon a Midnight Clear"	Hall & Oates	

== See also ==
- 2006 in music
- List of artists who reached number one on the U.S. Adult Contemporary chart
