= You and Me (Lifehouse song) =

2005 single by Lifehouse

Single by Lifehouse

from the album Lifehouse
- Released: January 28, 2005
- Recorded: October 2004
- Genre: Soft rock; pop rock; alternative rock
- Length: 3:16 (album version); 5:15 (extended wedding version)
- Label: Geffen
- Songwriters: Jason Wade; Jude Cole
- Producer: John Alagía

Lifehouse singles chronology
"Take Me Away" (2003)	"You and Me" (2005)	"Blind" (2005)

"You and Me" is a song by American alternative rock band Lifehouse. It is the first single released from their third studio album, Lifehouse (2005). The track was written by lead singer Jason Wade and American record producer Jude Cole. It was recorded and produced by John Alagía at his home studio in Easton, Maryland. The song was first released via digital download on January 28, 2005. It was then solicited to mainstream radio on March 15, 2005. An extended wedding version of the song was then released on July 26, 2005.

The song received positive reviews from critics, who noted that the song was more mellow and stripped-down than their previous singles. It became a commercial success, charting in the top five in the United States and also charting in Australia and New Zealand. On May 19, 2005, the song was certified gold by the Recording Industry Association of America (RIAA) for selling more than 500,000 units in the United States. In 2005, it became the ninth most downloaded song, according to Nielsen SoundScan. Because of its success, it appeared as the number-one song on Billboard's list of the top 40 Adult Pop Songs from 1996–2011 on March 16, 2011. A music video for the song premiered on MTV.com on March 21, 2005, and features a couple as Wade sings in a train station. "You and Me" has appeared on many television shows, including Smallville, Grey's Anatomy, The Vampire Diaries, Cold Case and Gavin & Stacey.

== Background and release ==
"You and Me" was written by Lifehouse lead singer Jason Wade and American record producer Jude Cole. It was recorded and produced by John Alagía at his home studio in Easton, Maryland. In an interview with MTV, Wade explained his experience working with Alagía, and said, "When we walked into John's house, we didn't know what to expect, and we get in there and the mixing board is in the living room, the B3 [organ] is in the kitchen and the piano is over there. And he's so nonchalant about all his stuff — there'd be a triple-platinum Dave Matthews Band plaque sticking out from under the bed." "You and Me" was first released via digital download on January 28, 2005. It was then solicited to mainstream radio on April 5, 2005. An extended wedding version of the song was released on July 26, 2005. On May 16, 2005, a CD single was issued in Australia.

== Composition and critical reception ==
John DiBiase of Jesus Freak Hideout described the song as "a tender acoustic love ballad" noting how the song was "noticeably more mellow and stripped-down than the band's previous singles." Ultimate Guitar called the song "a tender love-ballad" and noted how it would be "a perfect soundtrack for a wedding." Alternative Addiction said that the song was embraced by fans in the same way "Hanging by a Moment" was when Lifehouse started as a band. According to the sheet music published at Musicnotes.com by Sony/ATV Music Publishing, the song is set in 6/8 time with a "slow" tempo of 138 beats per minute (felt in 2 for 46 dotted crotchets per minute). It is composed in the key of G major with Wade's vocal range spanning from the low-note of B_{2} to the high-note of E_{4}. The song has a basic chord progression of G^{5}–G^{5}/C–G^{5}/F♯–G^{5}/B–Em^{7}–D^{sus4}–C.

== Chart performance ==
"You and Me" debuted at number 92 on the Billboard Hot 100 for the week of February 12, 2005. It stayed on the chart for 62 non-consecutive weeks, and eventually peaked at number five. On the Billboard Adult Contemporary chart, the song debuted at number 29 for the week of July 23, 2005. It eventually peaked at number one after it stayed on the chart for 34 non-consecutive weeks. The song debuted at number 29 on the Billboard Adult Top 40 chart for the week of February 19, 2005. After moving around the chart for 39 consecutive weeks, the song peaked at number one for nine non-consecutive weeks. Because of its success on the chart, "You and Me" became the number one song on Billboard's list of the Top 40 Adult Pop Songs from 1996–2011 on March 16, 2011.

"You and Me" debuted at number 37 on the Billboard Mainstream Top 40 chart during the week of May 21, 2005. It eventually peaked at number four after it spent 26 consecutive weeks on the chart. According to Nielsen SoundScan, "You and Me" was the ninth-top-selling digital song of 2005. On May 19, 2005, "You and Me" was certified gold by the RIAA for selling more than 500,000 units of the song. Throughout 2005, it sold 808,991 digital copies in the United States.

The song also achieved international success. In Australia, the song debuted at number 30 on the ARIA Charts for the week of May 29, 2005. That later became its peak after it spent four weeks on the chart. On the New Zealand Singles Chart, "You and Me" debuted at number 39, which later became its peak after it spent only one week on the chart during the week of October 31, 2005. The song has also ranked at number 83 on Billboard's Year-End Hot 100 singles of 2006.

== Music video ==
=== Background ===
The music video, directed by Bill Yukich, premiered on MTV.com on March 21, 2005. It was then released on iTunes for digital download on March 30, 2005.

=== Synopsis ===
The video starts with a woman exiting the taxi and going to the Los Angeles Union Station. A man exits a car and follows her. Wade then plays the first verse and first chorus in the waiting area of the L. A. Union Station. As the band plays the second verse, they are shown playing at the rooftop with Iron Mountain clearly visible. When the chorus plays again, they are shown at the roof with lights from the buildings of Downtown Los Angeles at night. When Wade sings the bridge, he is on the roof of the Roosevelt Hotel on Hollywood Boulevard. The man and the woman are also seen running in the boarding area of the Los Angeles Union Station. They later meet up and kiss in one of the boarding platforms of the station in front of a train which later starts to move. The video ends with the band sitting down in the waiting hall.

== Track listing ==
No.	Title	Writer(s)	Producer(s)	Length
1.	"You and Me"	Jason Wade; Jude Cole	John Alagia	3:15
2.	"Butterfly"	Wade	Wade	3:54
3.	"Ordinary Pain"	Wade; Stuart Mathis	Mathis	3:12

== Credits and personnel ==
Credits are taken from AllMusic.

- Songwriting – Jason Wade, Jude Cole
- Production – John Alagía
- Mixing – Jeff Juliano
- Engineering – Pete Hanlon, Jeff Juliano, Nathaniel Kunkel

== Charts ==
=== Weekly charts ===
Weekly chart performance for "You and Me"
Chart (2005–2006)	Peak position
Australia (ARIA)	30
Canada AC Top 30 (Radio & Records)	2
Canada CHR/Pop Top 30 (Radio & Records)	7
Canada Hot AC Top 30 (Radio & Records)	1
New Zealand (Recorded Music NZ)	39
Quebec (ADISQ)	20
US Billboard Hot 100	5
US Adult Contemporary (Billboard)	1
US Adult Pop Airplay (Billboard)	1
US Pop Airplay (Billboard)	4

=== Year-end charts ===
2005 year-end chart performance for "You and Me"
Chart (2005)	Position
US Billboard Hot 100	12
US Adult Contemporary (Billboard)	24
US Adult Top 40 (Billboard)	2
US Mainstream Top 40 (Billboard)	11

2006 year-end chart performance for "You and Me"
Chart (2006)	Position
US Billboard Hot 100	83
US Adult Contemporary (Billboard)	2
US Adult Top 40 (Billboard)	24

== Certifications ==
Certifications and sales for "You and Me"
Region	Certification	Certified units/sales
Australia (ARIA)	Gold	35,000^{^}
Brazil (Pro-Música Brasil)	Gold	30,000^{‡}
New Zealand (RMNZ)	2× Platinum	60,000^{‡}
United Kingdom (BPI)	Gold	400,000^{‡}
United States (RIAA)	Gold	500,000^{*}
^{*} Sales figures based on certification alone.^{^} Shipments figures based on certification alone.^{‡} Sales+streaming figures based on certification alone.

== Television appearances ==
On April 20, 2005, Lifehouse made a guest appearance in the Smallville season 4 episode "Spirit" and performed "You and Me" among other songs on stage. It also appeared in The 4400 episode "Life Interrupted" on July 17, 2005. Several months later, "You and Me" made two more TV appearances: first in the Boston Legal episode "Witches of Mass Destruction" that premiered on November 1, 2005, and then in the Grey's Anatomy's season 2 episode "Much Too Much" that premiered on November 27, 2005. The song also appeared in the Everwood episode "Getting to Know You" on December 8, 2005, and in the Cold Case season 3 episode "One Night" on March 19, 2006. On May 13, 2007, the song appeared in the pilot episode of Gavin & Stacey.

== See also ==
- List of Hot Adult Top 40 Tracks number-one singles of 2005
- List of Billboard Adult Contemporary number ones of 2006
