= Blind (Lifehouse song) =

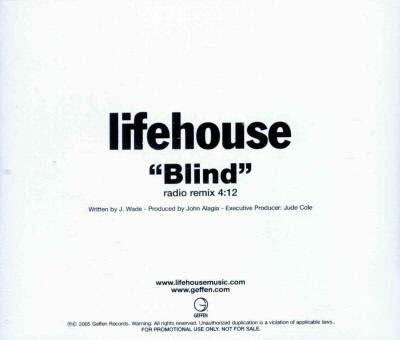

Single by Lifehouse

from the album Lifehouse
- Released: November 1, 2005
- Recorded: 2004
- Genre: Alternative rock
- Length: 5:00 (album version); 4:12 (radio remix)
- Label: Geffen
- Songwriter: Jason Wade
- Producers: John Alagía; Jude Cole

Lifehouse singles chronology
"You and Me" (2005)	"Blind" (2005)	"First Time" (2007)

"Blind" is a song by American alternative rock band Lifehouse. The song was released in November 2005 as the second radio single in support of the band's third studio album, Lifehouse. Despite failing to match the success of "You and Me", the song peaked at number 22 on the Billboard Adult Top 40 chart.

== Music video ==
The music video for the album's second single, "Blind", was released October 19, 2005. It stars Tina Majorino (most well known as Deb from the MTV film Napoleon Dynamite) and features several other up-and-coming young actors such as Sarch McClain, Stephen Cheung, and Andy Walters.

The video features a teenage goth (played by Tina Majorino), who lives with her neglectful father (Kevin Farley) in a house without her mother. She sees her father talking with a lover as she asks, "Who is this?", clearly indicating that it is not her mother, but just one of presumably many women her father has had in the house; he responds by throwing her journal & her books as he says, "IT'S MY HOUSE!!!," and pulling her hair. The teenager goes to the small room watching the band perform. She sees her dad and the woman kissing each other as she sits on the staircase, worrying, and her dad hands her some money. Her father is obviously separtated or divorced from her mother or the mother has passed away. Majorino, now, is seen wearing a white tank top, watching the concert in a big space, singing along to their music. Next, she is seen sitting on the couch, watching TV and writing in her diary, all at the same time. Her father changes the channel and grabbing her diary. The girl finally has enough and flees away, packs her things, and goes away. On her way out, she sees her dad kissing another woman, signifying that he isn't going to change.

== Track listing ==
1. "Blind" (Album Version) - 5:00
2. "Blind" (Radio Remix) - 4:12 (Jason Wade)

== Chart performance ==
Chart performance for "Blind"
Chart (2006)	Peak position
US Adult Pop Airplay (Billboard)	22

== Release history ==
Release dates and formats for "Blind"
Region	Date	Format	Label(s)	Ref.
United States	November 1, 2005	Mainstream airplay	Geffen	
