= From Where You Are =

Promotional single by Lifehouse

from the album Smoke & Mirrors
- Released: November 6, 2007
- Recorded: 2007
- Genre: Alternative rock
- Length: 3:06 (single version); 3:01 (album version)
- Label: Geffen
- Songwriter: Jason Wade
- Producer: Jude Cole

"From Where You Are" is a song by alternative rock band Lifehouse, written and performed by its frontman, Jason Wade for Allstate's Teen Driving Program and released as a promotional single on November 6, 2007. Produced by record producer Jude Cole, the song is dedicated to teens who have lost their lives in accidents, and was intended to encourage safe driving. This song is also dedicated to a friend of Wade who died in a car accident at the age of 16.

The music video combines clips of Wade in a recording studio and visuals recorded for Allstate commercials. The song appeared on the episode "Weeks Go by Like Days" of One Tree Hill. Three years later, in 2010, a revised version of the song appeared on the band's fifth album, Smoke & Mirrors.

== Charts ==
Chart performance for "From Where You Are"
| Chart (2007) | Peak position |
|---|---|
| US Billboard Hot 100 | 61 |
| US Billboard Pop 100 | 40 |
