= Lifehouse (album) =

Studio album by Lifehouse
- Released: March 22, 2005
- Recorded: 2004
- Studios: John Alagía's house (Easton, Maryland); Los Angeles, California
- Genres: Pop rock; alternative rock; post-grunge
- Length: 47:53
- Label: Geffen
- Producers: John Alagía; Jude Cole (also exec.)

Lifehouse chronology
Stanley Climbfall (2002)	Lifehouse (2005)	Who We Are (2007)

Singles from Lifehouse
- 1. "You and Me" Released: January 28, 2005; 2. "Blind" Released: November 1, 2005

Professional ratings
Review scores
Source	Rating
Allmusic	3/5 stars
Jesus Freak Hideout	4/5 stars
Melodic.net	3.5/5 stars
Rolling Stone	2/5 stars

Lifehouse is the self-titled third studio album by American rock band Lifehouse. It was released in March 2005, through Geffen Records as their former label DreamWorks Records was bought out by Geffen. Lifehouse featured less angst-ridden post-grunge present in the band's previous two albums in favor of a lighter, more radio-friendly, adult contemporary pop rock sound; this would continue with each of the band's subsequent releases. The album preceded by the single "You and Me".

It debuted and peaked at number ten on the Billboard 200—selling 63,000 copies in its first week of release—and received gold certification by the Recording Industry Association of America (RIAA) on September 7, 2005. By November 2009, Lifehouse sold an estimated 960,000 units domestically, and over three million units worldwide.

== Background ==
The album saw a notable shift in Lifehouse's sound. It was their first to be executive produced by American record producer Jude Cole, who had served as the band's talent manager since 2000. Lifehouse featured less angst-ridden post-grunge present in the band's previous two albums in favor of a lighter, more radio-friendly, adult contemporary pop rock sound; this would continue with each of the band's subsequent releases. The song "We'll Never Know" features a post-grunge flair, while the album's two lead singles, "You and Me" and "Blind", co-written and produced by Cole, respectively, both lean towards pop rock.

== Track listing ==
All tracks are written by Jason Wade, except where noted.

No.	Title	Writer(s)	Length
1.	"Come Back Down"		4:34
2.	"You and Me"	Wade; Jude Cole	3:15
3.	"Blind"		5:01
4.	"All in All"	Wade; Ean Mering	2:56
5.	"Better Luck Next Time"		3:38
6.	"Days Go By"		3:24
7.	"Into the Sun"	Wade; Scott Faircloff	5:21
8.	"Undone"		3:25
9.	"We'll Never Know"		3:25
10.	"Walking Away"		4:46
11.	"Chapter One"		3:39
12.	"The End Has Only Begun"		4:22
Total length:			47:53

Bonus tracks
No.	Title	Length
13.	"Today" (Special edition bonus track)	3:03
14.	"Along the Way" (UK and Japanese bonus track)	4:05
15.	"Through These Times" (Japanese bonus track)	4:13

== Personnel ==
Lifehouse

- Jason Wade – acoustic guitar, electric guitar, lead vocals, string arrangements
- Rick Woolstenhulme, Jr. – percussion, piano, drums
- Bryce Soderberg – bass guitar, background vocals
- John Alagía – bass guitar, piano, electric guitar, Hammond organ, ukulele, background vocals, vibraphone, Chamberlin
- Oliver Kraus – cello, string arrangements

Production

- John Alagía – producer, mixing
- Danny Clinch – photography
- Jude Cole – producer (on "Today" and "Along the Way"), executive producer
- Pete Hanlon – assistant engineer
- Ted Jensen – mastering
- Jeff Juliano – engineer, mixing
- Nathaniel Kunkel – string engineer

== Charts ==
=== Weekly charts ===
Weekly chart performance for Lifehouse
Chart (2005)	Peak position
Australian Albums (ARIA)	95
Canadian Albums (Nielsen SoundScan)	37
French Albums (SNEP)	163
Japanese Albums (Oricon)	143
US Billboard 200	10

=== Year-end charts ===
Year-end chart performance for Lifehouse
Chart (2005)	Position
US Billboard 200	99

== Certifications ==
Certifications for Lifehouse
Region	Certification	Certified units/sales
New Zealand (RMNZ)	Gold	7,500^{‡}
United States (RIAA)	Gold	960,000
^{‡} Sales+streaming figures based on certification alone.
