= All In (Lifehouse song) =

Single by Lifehouse

from the album Smoke & Mirrors
- Released: May 18, 2010
- Recorded: 2009
- Genre: Alternative rock
- Length: 3:54 (album version); 4:06 (music video)
- Label: Geffen
- Songwriter: Jason Wade
- Producer: Jude Cole

Lifehouse singles chronology
"Halfway Gone" (2009)	"All In" (2010)	"Between the Raindrops" (2012)

Music video
- "All In" on YouTube

"All In" is a song by American alternative rock band Lifehouse, released by Geffen Records on May 18, 2010, as the second single from their fifth studio album, Smoke & Mirrors (2010). It was produced by Jude Cole, and written by the band's lead vocalist Jason Wade. "All In" peaked atop Billboard's Bubbling Under Hot 100 chart, and became a hit on the magazine's Adult Alternative Songs, Adult Contemporary, and Adult Pop Airplay charts.

== Video ==
The video for All In was shot during their concert in Clemson, SC in June 2010 where they were the special guest for Daughtry.

== Charts ==
=== Weekly charts ===
Chart (2010)	Peak position
Australia (ARIA)	71
Netherlands (Single Top 100)	88
US Bubbling Under Hot 100 (Billboard)	1
US Adult Alternative Airplay (Billboard)	29
US Adult Contemporary (Billboard)	25
US Adult Pop Airplay (Billboard)	6
US Hot Christian Songs (Billboard)	26

=== Year-end charts ===
Chart (2010)	Position
US Adult Top 40 (Billboard)	26
