= Halfway Gone =

Single by Lifehouse

from the album Smoke & Mirrors
- Released: October 26, 2009
- Recorded: 2008
- Genre: Pop rock
- Length: 3:15
- Label: Geffen
- Songwriters: Jason Wade; Kevin Rudolf; Jacob Kasher Hindlin; Jude Cole
- Producers: Jason Wade; Jude Cole; Kevin Rudolf

Lifehouse singles chronology
| "Broken" (2008) | "Halfway Gone" (2009) | "All In" (2010) |

Music video
- "Halfway Gone" on YouTube

"Halfway Gone" is a song by American band Lifehouse. It is the first single released from their fifth studio album, Smoke & Mirrors (2010). It was first released via digital download in the United States and Canada on October 26, 2009. It was then solicited to mainstream radio on January 12, 2010. Several remixes of the song were later released on iTunes on April 6, 2010 in an album called Halfway Gone Remixes. The song was a commercial success, charting in Canada, the United States, Australia, Austria, Belgium, Germany, the Netherlands, and New Zealand. The accompanying music video portrays Lifehouse lead singer Jason Wade singing most of the lyrics in a park, and also features band cohorts and various people lip-syncing the lyrics as the song plays.

== Background and release ==
The song was written by Lifehouse's lead singer, Jason Wade, and American singer-songwriter Kevin Rudolf. In an interview with Billboard, Rudolf said, "I chose [to work on] 'Halfway Gone' because Jason Wade is such a great writer, great singer, and great artist." The song was produced by Lifehouse and record producer, Jude Cole, at MixStar Studios in Virginia Beach, VA. "Halfway Gone" was released via digital download in the United States and Canada on October 26, 2009. A few months later, it was solicited to mainstream radio on January 12, 2010.

== Composition and critical reception ==
"Halfway Gone"
A 15-second sample of "Halfway Gone" with the main chorus sung by Jason Wade.

"Halfway Gone" was described as a "fun rock-pop [song] that would brighten most people's day" by Alex Lai of Contactmusic.com. Nathaniel Schexnayder of Jesus Freak Hideout called the song an "effective rock song", noting that the song is "an easy album highlight as well as a hit single". Billboard's Michael Menachem gave a positive review of the song saying that "the song opens up with blurred 'wooh-ooh-oohs' that establish an uptempo pace, and its lively, danceable rhythm works well with frontman Jason Wade's vocals, which waver between intimate and explosive." He also said that working with Kevin Rudolf and Jacob Kasher resulted in "a fresh sound for Lifehouse as the band aims to extend its run on the hot AC and Billboard Hot 100 charts." Ultimate Guitar described the song as "laid-back in its approach", but commended its "hooks and infectious backing 'whoas' in the chorus."

== Chart performance ==
"Halfway Gone" debuted at number 99 on the Billboard Hot 100. It moved up and down the chart for several months and eventually peaked at number 50. It debuted on the Canadian Hot 100 at number 78. It stayed on the chart for 13 weeks, until peaking at number 67 on the chart. The song debuted and peaked on the Billboard Pop Songs chart at number 25. On the Billboard Hot Dance Club Songs chart, the song debuted at 43. It has since peaked at number 16, after being on the chart for 11 consecutive weeks. It debuted on Billboard's Radio Songs chart at number 67, and eventually peaked at number 47. On the Adult Contemporary chart, the song peaked at number 12 after being on the chart for 17 non-consecutive weeks. The song also charted on the Billboard Digital Songs chart and peaked at number 56.

The song also achieved international success. It debuted on Belgium's Ultratip chart at number 27 for the week of March 20, 2010 and stayed on the chart for seven consecutive weeks before peaking at number two on the chart. The song debuted on the Media Control Charts in Germany at number 35, which became its peak position on the chart. In Australia, the song debuted at number 47 on the ARIA Charts. It has since peaked at number 30, after being on the chart for eight weeks. The song debuted at number 63 in Austria, and later peaked at number 40 on the Ö3 Austria Top 40. It also charted in New Zealand, and debuted at number 34 on the New Zealand Singles Chart, which became its peak.

== Live performances ==
Lifehouse debuted their first live performance of "Halfway Gone" on The Tonight Show with Conan O'Brien on January 19, 2010. They also performed the song on Live with Regis and Kelly on March 2, 2010, and two days later on The Tonight Show with Jay Leno on March 4, 2010.

== Music video ==
The background makes it seem like people appear out of nowhere throughout the video.

The music video, directed by Frank Borin, was first released on Lifehouse's official website on November 24, 2009. Later that day, it was also released on iTunes. It features all Lifehouse members singing lead vocals, and also features miscellaneous people, including actresses Lola Blanc and Aurelia Scheppers, singing lead vocals throughout the music video.

In the music video, it begins with an out-of-focus view of Wade, seemingly alone, coming up a hill towards the camera. When he stops and starts singing, the camera comes into focus and the other band members come out from behind him and start lip-synching his vocals. A group of people (In which one of them is YouTube star, Wendy McColm) pull up in cars and they also lip-synch the song, in addition to performing other activities throughout the video. The video's effects allow people to seemingly appear out of nowhere throughout the video.

The video was shot in the Anthony C. Beilenson Park (formerly Balboa Park) in the Lake Balboa district of Los Angeles' San Fernando Valley.

== Remixes ==
Three remixes of "Halfway Gone" were released on April 6, 2010 into an extended play on iTunes, entitled Halfway Gone Remixes. The names of the remixes are the "Morgan Page Remix", the "Jody Den Broeder Club Remix", and the "Fred Falke Remix". The remixes were mixed by the progressive house producers Morgan Page and Jody Den Broeder, and house music producer Fred Falke.

Hayley Beck of CWG Magazine gave a positive review of the EP, saying "Honestly I could hear these songs being played in a nightclub, and I definitely never would've imagined myself dancing around to a Lifehouse track!" She continues to describe the album, and describes the vocals as "coarse vocals laid over a dancingly, mellow beat."

| No. | Title | Length |
|---|---|---|
| 1. | "Halfway Gone (Morgan Page Remix)" | 7:23 |
| 2. | "Halfway Gone (Jody Den Broeder Club Remix)" | 7:31 |
| 3. | "Halfway Gone (Fred Falke Remix)" | 7:25 |

== Credits and personnel ==
- Songwriting - Jason Wade, Kevin Rudolf, Jacob Kasher, Jude Cole
- Production - Jude Cole, Lifehouse
- Mixing - Serban Ghenea
- Engineering - John Hanes

Source: Smoke & Mirrors (Deluxe Version) - iTunes LP

== Charts ==
=== Weekly charts ===
| Chart (2009–2010) | Peak position |
|---|---|
| Australia (ARIA) | 30 |
| Austria (Ö3 Austria Top 40) | 40 |
| Belgium (Ultratip Bubbling Under Flanders) | 2 |
| Canada Hot 100 (Billboard) | 67 |
| Germany (GfK) | 35 |
| Netherlands (Dutch Top 40) | 14 |
| Netherlands (Single Top 100) | 64 |
| New Zealand (Recorded Music NZ) | 34 |
| Quebec (ADISQ) | 26 |
| US Billboard Hot 100 | 50 |
| US Adult Alternative Airplay (Billboard) | 15 |
| US Adult Contemporary (Billboard) | 12 |
| US Adult Pop Airplay (Billboard) | 2 |
| US Dance Club Songs (Billboard) | 16 |
| US Pop Airplay (Billboard) | 25 |

=== Year-end charts ===
| Chart (2010) | Position |
|---|---|
| Netherlands (Dutch Top 40) | 67 |
| US Adult Contemporary (Billboard) | 24 |
| US Adult Top 40 (Billboard) | 6 |

== Release history ==
Release dates and formats for "Halfway Gone"
| Region | Date | Format | Label(s) | Ref. |
|---|---|---|---|---|
| United States | January 12, 2010 | Mainstream airplay | Interscope | |
