= Diff's Lucky Day =

EP by Blyss
- Released: May 8, 1999
- Genre: Alternative rock
- Producer: Ron Aniello

Blyss chronology
Diff's Lucky Day (1999)	No Name Face (2000)

Diff's Lucky Day is an EP by post-grunge band Blyss, the precursor to Lifehouse.

With Ron Aniello as the album's producer, frontman Jason Wade and his band, comprising Sergio Andrande, Jon "Diff" Palmer, Collin Hayden, and Aaron Lord, released their album in 1999 for sale at concerts and distribution among friends or potential industry contacts.

The album was also remastered and released by Lifehouse on December 19, 2025 on Apple Music and Spotify under the ALLSWELL Records label.

== Track listing ==
All tracks are written by Jason Wade.

No.	Title	Length
1.	"Cling and Clatter"	4:28
2.	"Unknown"	4:05
3.	"Fool"	4:18
4.	"Crown of Scars"	4:50
5.	"Mudpie"	5:07
6.	"Trying"	3:52
7.	"Storm"	4:41
8.	"Breathing"	4:28
9.	"Somewhere in Between"	4:12
10.	"Fairy Tales and Castles"	3:21
11.	"What's Wrong with That?"	4:35
12.	"Revolution Cry"	6:53
Total length:		54:10

== Personnel ==
- Jason Wade - vocals, rhythm guitar
- Collin Hayden - lead guitar
- Aaron Lord - keyboards
- Sergio Andrade - bass guitar
- Diff (Jon Palmer) - drums
