= Bryce Soderberg =

Canadian musician (born 1980)

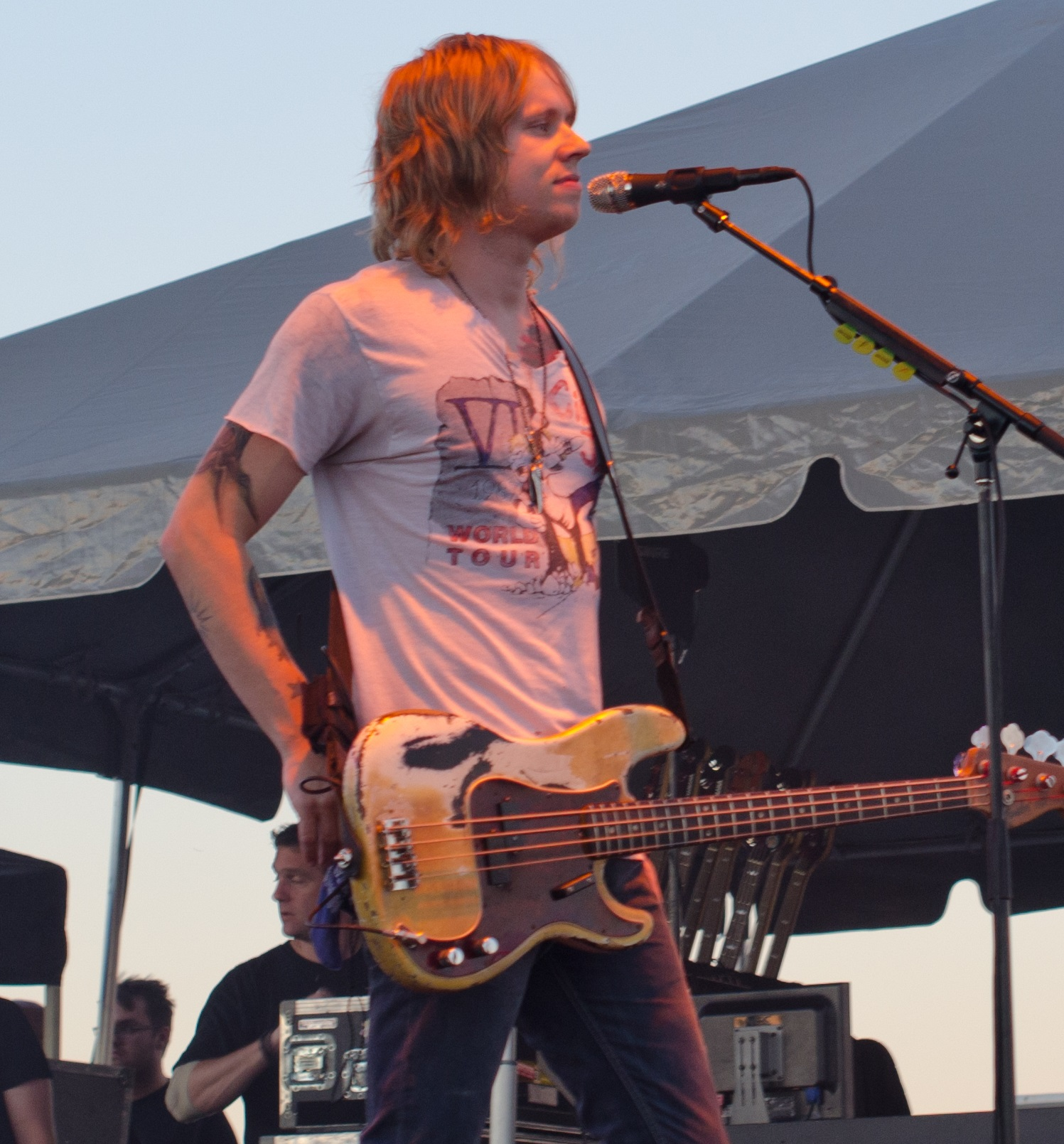
- Soderberg performing with Lifehouse in Norfolk, Nebraska in 2013

Background information
- Born: Bryce Dane Soderberg; April 10, 1980 (age 46); Victoria, British Columbia, Canada
- Genre: Alternative rock
- Occupations: Singer; songwriter; guitarist
- Instruments: Bass guitar, vocals
- Years active: 2004–present
- Labels: DreamWorks, Geffen Interscope
- Member of: Lifehouse; AM Radio

Bryce Dane Soderberg (born April 10, 1980) is a Canadian musician and songwriter, best known as the bassist and vocalist for American rock band Lifehouse.

== Early life ==
Soderberg was born in Victoria, British Columbia, and raised outside Victoria in the Municipality of Sooke. He started playing bass at a young age and developed his musicianship mostly in his basement with his brothers. He graduated from St. Michaels University School then after attending two years of college in Quebec, Canada, he moved to Los Angeles, California when he was 19 to pursue a professional career in music. In 2002, he joined Elektra recording artists AM Radio, under the management of Rivers Cuomo. After Elektra Records folded, AM Radio disbanded. During this time, as a vocalist/songwriter he performed with The Celebrities, and Tomorrow And Everyday After. In August 2004, Soderberg joined Lifehouse after a recommendation from former member Sean Woolstenhulme.

== Lifehouse ==
After joining Lifehouse, Soderberg and his bandmates toured and released the self-titled Lifehouse, the band's third album. They released the single "You and Me". Between touring, Lifehouse released their fourth album, Who We Are and Smoke And Mirrors. Soderberg sings lead and co-wrote the track "Wrecking Ball" on Smoke and Mirrors. He also shares lead vocals on the song "Here Tomorrow and Gone Today".

Soderberg plays Rickenbacker and Fender basses through Ampeg SVT Classic Heads and 8x10 cabs.

He also performs as the lead vocals for the song "Bridges" on some live performances.

== KOMOX ==
Along with members Pelle Hillström and Kris Persson, Soderberg has an alternative side project based in Los Angeles called KOMOX. They released Dreaming Awake, Vol 1. during the week of January 3, 2016. A reworked version of Soderberg's song Stardust, co-written with Hillström for the KOMOX project, appears on Lifehouse's 2015 album Out of the Wasteland.
