= Stanley Climbfall =

Studio album by Lifehouse
- Released: September 17, 2002
- Recorded: December 2001 – June 2002
- Studios: Royaltone (North Hollywood, California)
- Length: 50:16
- Label: DreamWorks
- Producer: Ron Aniello

Lifehouse chronology
| No Name Face (2000) | Stanley Climbfall (2002) | Lifehouse (2005) |

Singles from Stanley Climbfall
- 1. "Spin" Released: July 22, 2002; 2. "Take Me Away" Released: March 3, 2003

Stanley Climbfall is the second studio album by American rock band Lifehouse. It was released on September 17, 2002, through DreamWorks Records. It was produced by Ron Aniello, the producer of the band's first record, No Name Face (2000). Supported by the singles "Spin" and "Take Me Away", the album debuted at number seven on the Billboard 200 but did not perform as well commercially as No Name Face. "Take Me Away" peaked at number 22 on Billboard's Adult Pop Songs chart. Stanley Climbfall has sold over one million copies domestically. Stanley Climbfall is the first Lifehouse album to feature drummer Rick Woolstenhulme, Jr..

== Critical reception ==
Professional ratings
Review scores
| Source | Rating |
|---|---|
| AllMusic | 2.5/5 stars |
| Entertainment Weekly | B |
| Jesus Freak Hideout | 4/5 stars |
| Melodic | 3/5 stars |
| musicOMH | (average) |
| Orlando Sentinel | (average) |
| People | (unfavorable) |
| Stylus Magazine | A− |
| USA Today | 1.5/4 stars |

Stanley Climbfall received mixed reviews from critics, who both praised and criticized lead singer Jason Wade's songwriting and the album's repetitive sound. Billboard published a positive review of the album, with writer L. F. describing it as "as close to bullet-proof as one can get...meticulously measured and carefully designed" and Wade as a "top-shelf songwriter" with a "knack for weaving smarter-than-average lyrics into tightly constructed, instantly memorable melodies." Josh Tyrangiel of Entertainment Weekly called the album "Charming harmlessness" with "Wade us[ing] his Vedderesque baritone to dress the usual word salad of sadness, alienation, and overcoming sadness and alienation." He pinpointed "Spin", "Take Me Away", and "Out of Breath" as standout tracks on the album.

In contrast, AllMusic's Dean Carlson felt the album was "exhausting", given that several other bands had a similar sound, and felt that Aniello and Brendan O'Brien's production "transform[ed] possible sincerity into self-importance and drain[ed] the band of any real individuality."

== Commercial performance ==
Stanley Climbfall debuted at number seven on the Billboard 200 in the United States, with 74,000 copies sold. In its second week on the ranking, it charted at number 30 with a further 26,000 copies sold. According to Nielsen SoundScan, 285,000 cumulative copies of the album were sold in the country by February 2003. Four months later, sales reached the 800,000 mark, "a definite comedown" from the band's debut album No Name Face (2000). The album's domestic commercial performance was attributed in part to a lack of promotion—the band went on tour in Europe first, at the direction of its label, to "make up" for previously only touring for a week in the territory in support of No Name Face—and the absence "of a breakout hit on the scale of 'Hanging By A Moment'". In response, Wade said that the album was "not about sales, but rather furthering his craft and maturing as an artist". In November 2009, Billboard reported that sales of the album had reached 1,010,000 copies in the US. It eventually surpassed 1 million sales domestically.

== Track listing ==
Stanley Climbfall track listing
| No. | Title | Writer(s) | Length |
|---|---|---|---|
| 1. | "Spin" | Jason Wade; Ron Aniello | 4:51 |
| 2. | "Wash" | Wade | 4:48 |
| 3. | "Sky Is Falling" | Wade | 3:29 |
| 4. | "Anchor" | Wade; Carl Broemel | 5:02 |
| 5. | "Am I Ever Gonna Find Out" | Wade; Aniello | 2:39 |
| 6. | "Stanley Climbfall" | Wade; Aniello | 3:49 |
| 7. | "Out of Breath" | Wade; Aniello | 3:20 |
| 8. | "Just Another Name" | Wade | 3:24 |
| 9. | "Take Me Away" | Wade; Sergio Andrade | 4:47 |
| 10. | "My Precious" | Wade | 4:24 |
| 11. | "Empty Space" | Wade | 5:02 |
| 12. | "The Beginning" | Wade | 4:38 |

Expanded Edition
| No. | Title | Writer(s) | Length |
|---|---|---|---|
| 13. | "How Long" | Wade | 5:09 |
| 14. | "Sky Is Falling" (acoustic version) | Wade | 2:53 |

== Personnel ==
Lifehouse

- Jason Wade – vocals, guitars
- Sergio Andrade – bass
- Rick Woolstenhulme, Jr. – drums

Production

- Ron Aniello – producer
- Brendan O'Brien – mixing

== Charts ==
=== Weekly charts ===
Weekly chart performance for Stanley Climbfall
| Chart (2002) | Peak position |
|---|---|
| Australian Albums (ARIA) | 39 |
| Canadian Albums (Billboard) | 9 |
| Dutch Albums (Album Top 100) | 79 |
| Danish Albums (Hitlisten) | 24 |
| German Albums (Offizielle Top 100) | 65 |
| New Zealand Albums (RMNZ) | 25 |
| Swedish Albums (Sverigetopplistan) | 47 |
| US Billboard 200 | 7 |
| US Contemporary Christian Albums (Billboard) | 1 |

=== Year-end charts ===
2002 year-end chart performance for Stanley Climbfall
| Chart (2002) | Position |
|---|---|
| Canadian Alternative Albums (Nielsen SoundScan) | 98 |
