= Between the Raindrops =

Single by Lifehouse featuring Natasha Bedingfield

from the album Almeria
- Released: September 11, 2012
- Length: 4:46
- Label: Geffen
- Songwriters: Jason Wade; Jude Cole; Jacob Kasher Hindlin
- Producers: Lifehouse; Jude Cole

Lifehouse singles chronology
| "All In" (2010) | "Between the Raindrops" (2012) | "Flight" (2014) |

Natasha Bedingfield singles chronology
| "As Long as We Got Love" (2011) | "Between the Raindrops" (2012) | "Kick It" (2019) |

Music video
- "Between the Raindrops" on YouTube

"Between the Raindrops" is a song by American alternative rock band Lifehouse, which features British singer Natasha Bedingfield. The song serves as the lead and only single for their sixth studio album, Almería (2012). The single was released on September 11, 2012.

== Music video ==
A music video for the song was shot in October 5, together with Natasha Bedingfield. It was released on November 9 via Vevo. As the band leaves a ranch to escape an impending storm, packing their possessions into a truck, lead singer Jason Wade stays behind as he and Bedingfield perform their duet across a valley. As the storm moves in, two white horses are sent galloping into the rain as Wade lights a flare. The video ends with the storm clearing and Wade walking down a country road with a guitar.

== Weekly charts ==
| Chart (2012–13) | Peak position |
|---|---|
| Canada (Canadian Hot 100) | 16 |
| US Billboard Hot 100 | 79 |
| US Adult Alternative Airplay (Billboard) | 27 |
| US Adult Pop Songs (Billboard) | 21 |
