= Lifehouse (band) =

American rock band

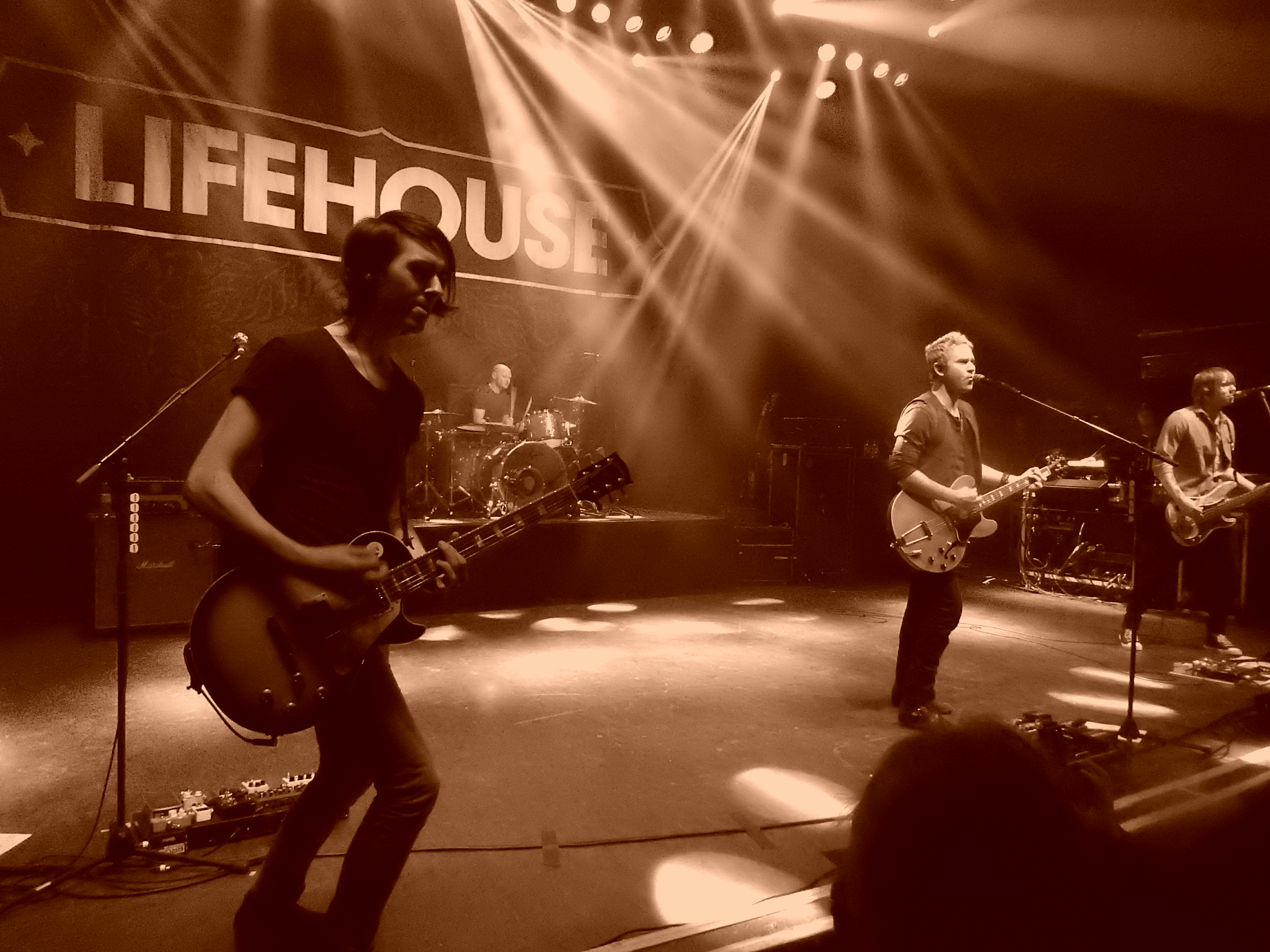
- Lifehouse in 2015

Background information
- Also known as: Blyss (1995–2000)
- Origin: Los Angeles, California, U.S.
- Genres: Alternative rock; post-grunge; pop rock
- Works: Lifehouse discography
- Years active: 1995–present (on hiatus since 2021)
- Labels: DreamWorks; Geffen; Interscope; Ironworks; Allswell
- Spinoffs: AM Radio, KOMOX
- Spinoff of: Blyss
- Producer(s): Jude Cole
- Members: Jason Wade; Rick Woolstenhulme Jr.; Bryce Soderberg; Steve Stout
- Past members: Ben Carey; Sean Woolstenhulme; Sergio Andrade; Jon "Diff" Palmer; Collin Hayden; Aaron Lord
- Website: lifehousemusic.com

Lifehouse is an American rock band from Los Angeles, California, composed of Jason Wade (lead vocals, rhythm guitar, piano), Rick Woolstenhulme Jr. (drums, percussion), Bryce Soderberg (bass, vocals), and Steve Stout (lead guitar). The band came to mainstream prominence with their 2000 single "Hanging by a Moment", which led their debut studio album, No Name Face (2000). The song peaked at number two on the Billboard Hot 100, won a Billboard Music Award for Hot 100 Single of the Year—having spent 20 weeks within the top ten and over a cumulative year on the chart—and was named the best-performing single of 2001 despite not reaching the top position, making it the fourth song in the chart's history to do so.

The band has released six subsequent albums—Stanley Climbfall (2002), their eponymous third album (2005), Who We Are (2007), Smoke and Mirrors (2010), Almería (2012), and Out of the Wasteland (2015). Each were met with similar albeit trailing commercial success, spawning the singles "You and Me", "First Time", and "Whatever It Takes"—each became hits on the Mainstream Top 40, Adult Top 40, and Adult Contemporary charts, as well as the Billboard Hot 100.

AllMusic characterizes the band's sound as a "commercial blend" of pop rock-style melody and "throaty post-grunge vocals". Lifehouse is exemplary of the adult contemporary format, meaning the band's songs are often played at public, family-oriented retail venues including supermarkets, convention centers, and malls.

== History ==
=== 1996–1999: Blyss and formation ===
Jason Wade had been writing songs as a coping mechanism since his parents' divorce. After moving to Los Angeles in 1995, he met bassist Sergio Andrade, his next-door neighbor. The following year, Wade, Andrade, and Jon "Diff" Palmer formed Blyss, the forerunner of Lifehouse, and began to play live shows at high schools and colleges. Later, Collin Hayden and Aaron Lord were added to the band.

Soon thereafter, word-of-mouth reached producer Ron Aniello, who introduced Jason to Jude Cole, who in turn introduced him to DreamWorks Records principal Michael Ostin. In 1998, Aniello produced Blyss's first demos, with the financial backing of DreamWorks Records. Some of these recordings would form the 1999 EP Diff's Lucky Day, which would be sold at live concerts or distributed among friends and music industry contacts.

=== 2000–2001: No Name Face ===
In 2000, Blyss re-recorded, remixed, and released 12 of the 15 Diff's Lucky Day session demos as No Name Face, their debut major label release under the name of Lifehouse. On their choosing the band name, frontman Jason Wade said, "It's about what we do as a band and for me personally. Most of this record is about my life and about life's circumstances. Not only my life, but other people's lives. We thought Lifehouse was a good name for it."

No Name Face met significant commercial success and established the band; the album would eventually would sell in excess of four million copies worldwide. This was in part due to the success of "Hanging by a Moment", Lifehouse's first commercial single. Due to the charisma and talent of frontman Wade, DreamWorks Records' focus was primarily on him. "Hanging by a Moment" was the third song in chart history to be named the "No. 1 Song of the Year" on the Billboard Hot 100 despite not having reached No. 1 on any weekly Billboard Hot 100 survey (after Sam the Sham & The Pharaohs' "Wooly Bully" in 1965 and Faith Hill's "Breathe" in 2000). The second single from the album, "Sick Cycle Carousel", was not as commercially successful as "Hanging by a Moment", peaking at No. 21 on the Billboard Modern Rock chart; the third and final single was "Breathing", a reworking of a song featured on Diff's Lucky Day.

The song "Everything" was the first of many Lifehouse songs to be featured in The WB's future hit series Smallville. It was used in the series pilot and season 1 finale, and again in the series' 200th episode "Homecoming" in the show's 10th and final season, as an homage to its season 1 episodes nine years prior. The song "You and Me" from the band's eponymous third album would be released on Smallville's second soundtrack, Smallville: The Metropolis Mix, in an extended form subtitled "You and Me (Wedding Version)", and the band itself would perform the song live as a special guest appearance in the school prom scene at the end of the season 4 episode "Spirit". Seven of the band's songs would be featured in episodes of the series' first four seasons.

The song "Somewhere in Between", also from No Name Face, was featured in the first-season episode of Falcon Beach, "The Blame Game".

By the time Lifehouse's first album was released, Palmer had left the band, and Wade and Andrade were the only remaining founding members. According to former band member Aaron Lord, there was a "bad breakup" within the band and "[t]hree other band members were axed for supposedly not keeping up their chops." Soon after recording No Name Face, Wade and Andrade met Rick Woolstenhulme, who auditioned for the needed drummer part and joined the band as full-time drummer. Before the audition, Woolstenhulme had been rehearsing in an adjacent room to Lifehouse and frequently he and Wade would pass each other without meeting the other.

=== 2002–2004: Stanley Climbfall ===
Shortly after a long tour for No Name Face, Lifehouse reentered the studio to cut their second album, Stanley Climbfall. The album's initial success was short-lived and its singles, 2002's "Spin" and 2003's "Take Me Away", were vastly overshadowed by the success of the first album. Shortly after the album debuted, Rick's brother Sean Woolstenhulme (of The Calling) officially became the fourth member of the band in June 2002. He had previously toured with Lifehouse.

In April 2004, Sergio Andrade confirmed that he had decided to leave the band to pursue individual projects. Shortly after his departure, Sean also left the band to pursue other musical projects such as Abandoned Pools and The Jimmy Chamberlin Complex.

=== 2004–2005: Lifehouse ===
Jason Wade and Rick Woolstenhulme remained the active members of Lifehouse. In September 2004, Bryce Soderberg (previously of AM Radio) signed on as Lifehouse's new bassist. On July 6, 2004, they went to Maryland to begin work on their eponymous third album, spending less than two months in the studio to record thirteen songs produced by John Alagia. Lifehouse was released on March 22, 2005.

The album's first single, "You and Me", was released for airplay on January 18, 2005. It was written several years prior and was originally performed by Jason Wade for the 2000 independent film All Over Again. The song was a success and stayed on the U.S. Billboard Hot 100 for 62 weeks (the fifth longest-charted in history), peaking at No. 5. The song also appears on the soundtrack to Smallville. One episode, "Spirit", featured the band actually performing it and three other songs from the album ("Come Back Down", "Blind", and "Undone") on the show. The song has also appeared on Cold Case, Boston Legal, Gavin & Stacey, Everwood, Grey's Anatomy, The 4400 and Medium as well as the commercial for the final episode of Zoey 101. The song "All In All" was featured in Scrubs. The music video for the album's second single, "Blind", was released October 19, 2005. It starred Tina Majorino and featured several other up-and-coming young actors such as Sarch McClain, Stephen Cheung, Christopher Thien Duc Van and Andy Walters.

In 2006, the newly written song "Good Enough" was featured in the Disney film The Wild and was repeated over the end credits.

=== 2006–2008: Who We Are ===
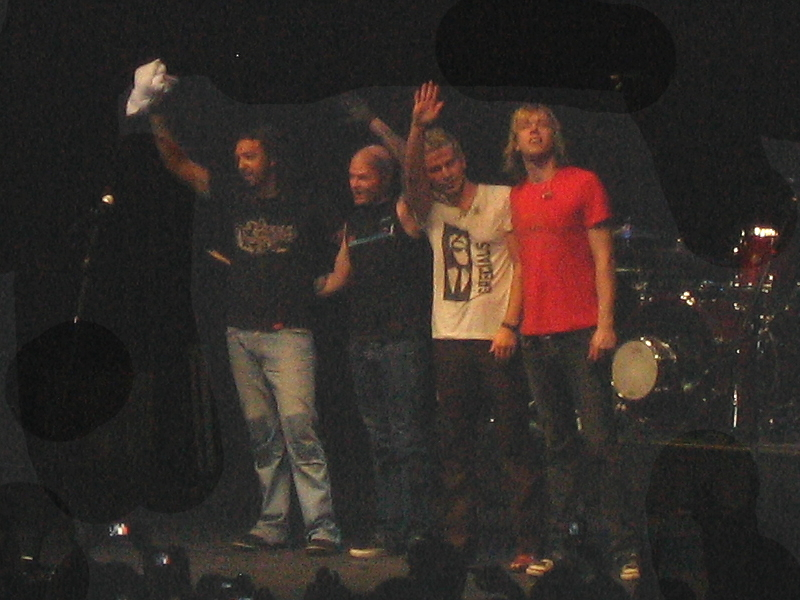
Lifehouse in 2008

Lifehouse began recording their fourth album in mid-2006 at Kiefer Sutherland and Jude Cole's recording studio, Ironworks Studios in Los Angeles. Their fourth album, entitled Who We Are, was released on June 19, 2007. The album features Wade, Woolstenhulme and Soderberg as its lineup, and "rocks a little harder" than their previous album, according to the band. The album's release was followed by a tour with The Goo Goo Dolls and Colbie Caillat, which began June 15 at the Dodge Theatre in Phoenix, AZ.

The album's first single was a bright, pop rock love song "First Time", released on April 24, 2007. The song debuted on the Billboard Hot 100 at number 48 in May, and peaked at number three on the Hot Adult Top 40 Charts. The album's second single, "Whatever It Takes" was released to radio stations on October 29, 2007. "Broken", the album's third single, peaked at number 83 on the Billboard Hot 100. "Broken" has appeared on several television series, including Grey's Anatomy ("Lay Your Hands On Me"), Criminal Minds ("In Birth and Death", season 3, episode 2), One Tree Hill, One Life to Live and The Hills. Most recently, it was featured in the film soundtrack The Time Traveler's Wife.

Lifehouse held a contest to make a video for the song "Make Me Over". The band gave 60 USC School of Cinematic Arts graduate students a chance to shoot the video for their new single. The winning video premiered at a gala event on December 5, 2008, at the Paley Center for Media in Beverly Hills, CA.

The album was certified Gold by the Recording Industry Association of America (RIAA) in October 2008.

=== 2008–2011: Smoke and Mirrors ===
On April 11, 2009, the band announced that Ben Carey was an official member of the band. They said that they had been "a four-piece for some time" and that Ben is "family to us". Carey had been touring with the band since 2004.

The single "Halfway Gone" was released on October 27, 2009. The music video premiered on the VH1 Top 20 on VH1.com at the end of November. Smoke & Mirrors was released on March 2, 2010. The album debuted at No. 6 on the Billboard 200 with 54,000 copies sold. This marked the band's highest chart debut to date, surpassing their previous peak at No. 7 with Stanley Climbfall in 2002.

=== 2011–2012: Almería ===
On September 11, 2012, Lifehouse released a new single featuring Natasha Bedingfield entitled "Between the Raindrops". A month later, on October 18, the band announced that the title of their sixth studio album would be Almería, named after a city in Spain famous as the locale of many classic Spaghetti Western films. Almería was released on December 11 in the US and December 12 worldwide. The album was met with mixed reviews, and failed to spawn a second single.

=== 2013–2018: Out of the Wasteland and Greatest Hits ===
On July 24, 2013, Wade posted a letter to the band's Facebook page saying that Lifehouse had parted with Geffen and was on a temporary hiatus as each band member turned attention to other projects (with the assurance that the band would continue to make records in the future). Drummer Rick Woolstenhulme Jr. began touring with the Goo Goo Dolls; bassist Bryce Soderberg initiated a new band titled KOMOX; lead guitarist Ben Carey continued work in country rock band Elvis Monroe; and singer and songwriter Jason Wade worked on his as-yet-unreleased singer-songwriter solo record. The band's final show before their break was on September 25, 2013.

Lifehouse reentered the studio in May 2014. "Flight" was released independently on November 18, along with an announcement that the band's hiatus was officially over and a new album entitled Seven would be released in April 2015. On December 8, 2014, Lifehouse stated on their official website that Ben Carey would no longer be a part of Lifehouse and instead would be focusing on his own projects; for live shows, the band later revealed that Steve Stout would fill in on lead guitar.

The album's first official single, "Hurricane", was released on January 27, 2015. On January 27, Billboard.com revealed a new album title Out of the Wasteland and published the official standard-edition track list of the album, giving an official release date of May 19, 2015. The album was released online and in stores on May 26, 2015, and debuted at number one on the Independent Albums chart. A special Target edition was made available with four bonus tracks.

The band was to begin touring in support of the album on June 19, as an opening act on the second North American leg of Nickelback's No Fixed Address Tour, before the tour was cancelled due to the health of Nickelback's lead singer, Chad Kroeger. A European headlining tour commenced on September 15, 2015, in Amsterdam, with extra dates added due to high demand.

In June 2017, the band released their first Greatest Hits compilation, featuring all 17 of their radio singles to date in chronological order, plus one non-single that still charted on radio. Lifehouse spent the summer of 2017 touring throughout the United States and Canada with Switchfoot in support of the album. It marked the first North American tour by the band since 2011. During the tour, Wade teamed up with Switchfoot's Jon Foreman, to help raise funds for Houston's Hurricane Harvey victims through the track called "Shine Like Gold".

In early 2018, Lifehouse toured with Collective Soul across South Africa.

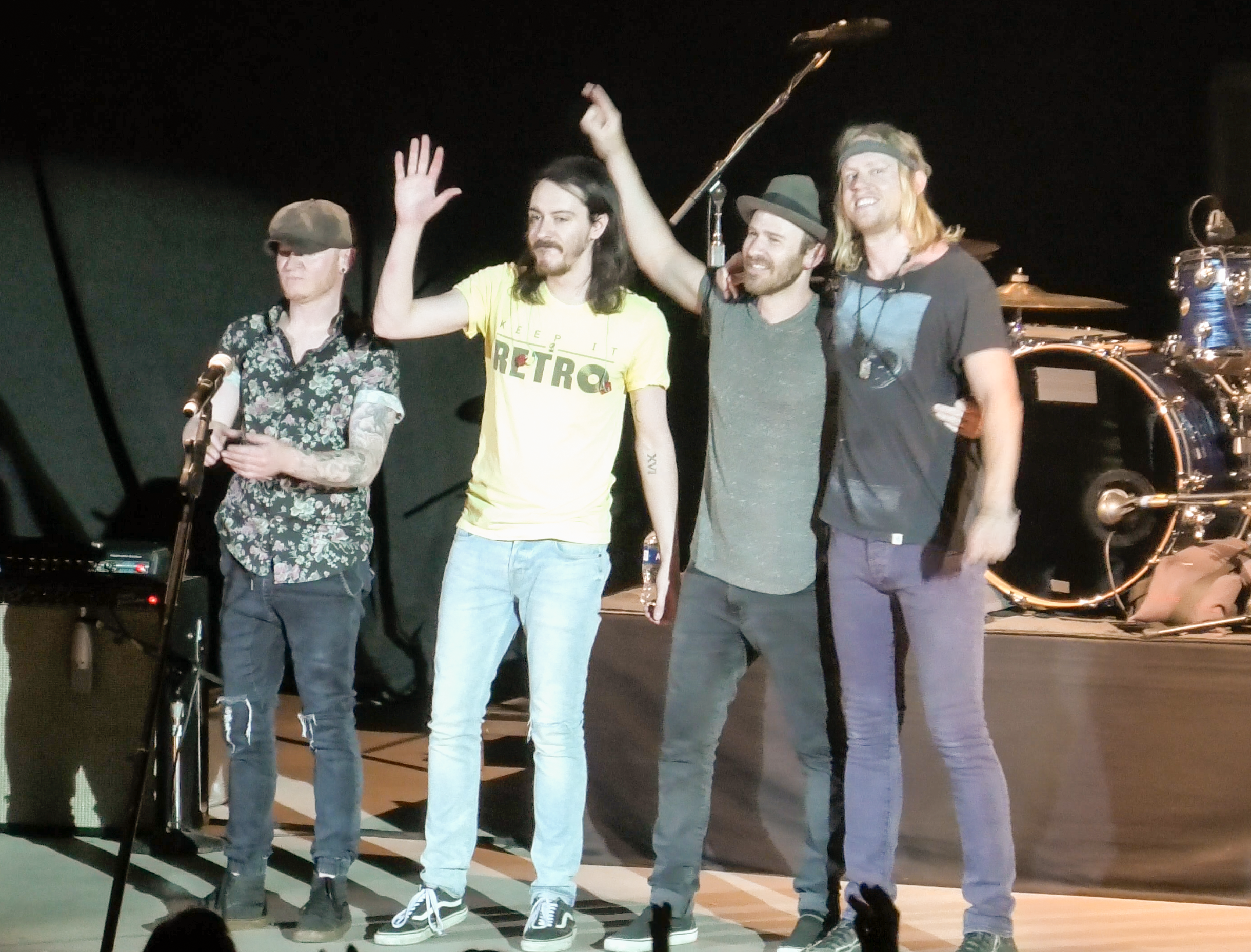
Lifehouse at the 2019 Alameda County Fair

=== 2019–present: Hiatus and Goodbye Kanan ===
Lifehouse released their first single in six years, "Cut & Run", in April 2021. The first single recorded with member Steve Stout, who had collaborated with Jason Wade on the side project ØZWALD and officially became the band's lead guitarist in 2017, the song was succeeded by four more singles over the course of 2021. The band compiled these five singles and one new track into their first EP, Goodbye Kanan, released on November 26, 2021, under their own label Allswell Records.

== Other information ==
Wade wrote the song "From Where You Are" for Allstate's Teen Driving Program. The song was featured on the "Tall Lights" commercial and aired on NBC.

== Band members ==
=== Last active line-up ===
- Jason Wade – lead vocals, rhythm guitar, piano (1995–2021)
- Rick Woolstenhulme Jr. – drums, percussion, occasional backing vocals (2000–2021)
- Bryce Soderberg – bass guitar, backing and occasional lead vocals (2004–2021)
- Steve Stout – lead guitar, backing vocals (2017–2021; touring musician 2015–2017)

=== Former members ===
- Aaron Lord – keyboards, violin, viola, mandolin, acoustic guitar (1995–2000)
- Jon "Diff" Palmer – drums, percussion (1995–2000)
- Collin Hayden – lead guitar, backing vocals (1995–1999)
- Tim Rhodes – lead guitar, backing vocals (1999–2000)
- Sergio Andrade – bass guitar (1995–2004)
- Sean Woolstenhulme – lead guitar, backing vocals (2002–2004)
- Ben Carey – lead guitar, backing vocals (2009–2014; touring musician 2004–2009)

==== Former touring musicians ====
- Stuart Mathis – lead guitar, backing vocals (2000–2001)
- Joerg Koehrig – lead guitar, backing vocals (2001–2002)

== Awards and nominations ==
=== American Music Awards ===
Year	Nominee / work	Award	Result
2002	Lifehouse	Favorite Pop/Rock New Artist	Nominated

=== BDS Spin Awards ===
Year	Nominee / work	Award	Result
2003	"Spin"	100,000 Spins	Won
2004	"Hanging By a Moment"	800,000 Spins	Won
2007	"You and Me"	600,000 Spins	Won
2009	"Whatever It Takes"	300,000 Spins	Won
2009	"First Time"	300,000 Spins	Won

=== Billboard Music Awards ===
The Billboard Music Awards is sponsored by Billboard magazine and held annually in December.

Year	Nominee / work	Award	Result
2001	Lifehouse	Rock New Artist Of the Year	Won
2001	Lifehouse	Male New Artist Of the Year	Won
2001	Lifehouse	Hot 100 Singles Group/Duo	Nominated
2001	"Hanging By a Moment"	Top Hot 100 Song	Won
2001	"Hanging By a Moment"	Modern Rock Track of the Year	Nominated

=== BMI Pop Awards ===
Lifehouse has received 10 BMI awards

Year	Nominee / work	Award	Result
2002	"Hanging By a Moment"	Most Performed Song on College Radio	Won
2002	"Hanging By a Moment"	Best Pop (2nd Award)	Won
2003	"Hanging By a Moment"	Best Pop (3rd Award)	Won
2006	"You and Me"	Best Pop	Won
2007	"You and Me"	Best Pop (2nd Award)	Won
2008	"Whatever It Takes"	Best Pop	Won
2008	"First Time"	Best Pop	Won
2010	"Broken"	Best Pop	Won
2011	"Halfway Gone"	Best Pop	Won
2012	"All In"	Best Pop	Won

=== Radio Music Awards ===
The Radio Music Awards is an annual awards ceremony to honor the most played songs/artists on the radio.

Year	Nominee / work	Award	Result
2001	"Hanging By a Moment"	Song of the Year / Pop Alternative Radio	Won
2001	"Hanging By a Moment"	Song of the Year / Top 40-Pop Radio	Nominated
2005	"You and Me"	Song of the Year/Adult Hit Radio	Nominated

=== Teen Choice Awards ===
Year	Nominee / work	Award	Result
2001	"Hanging By a Moment"	Choice - Rock Track	Nominated
2001	"Hanging By a Moment"	Choice Breakout Artist	Nominated
2005	"You and Me"	Choice - Love Song	Nominated
2007	"First Time"	Choice - Love Song	Nominated

== Discography ==
As Blyss

- Diff's Lucky Day (1999)

As Lifehouse

- No Name Face (2000)
- Stanley Climbfall (2002)
- Lifehouse (2005)
- Who We Are (2007)
- Smoke & Mirrors (2010)
- Almería (2012)
- Out of the Wasteland (2015)
