= Ironworks Music =

Independent record label

- Founded: 2003
- Founder: Kiefer Sutherland; Jude Cole
- Status: Defunct
- Genre: Rock; country
- Country of origin: United States

Ironworks Music was an independent record label created and owned by the actor Kiefer Sutherland, and his long-time friend and fellow musician, Jude Cole. The studio's first signed band, whom it is also known for, is Rocco DeLuca's band, Rocco DeLuca and the Burden.

Ironworks Studio is housed in an old ironworks foundry in the Silver Lake area of Los Angeles and managed by Mark Somgynari.

We don't rent the studio out, it's literally for bands that we have developed and that we're finding. It's unbelievable how many fantastic bands there are out there that are just not being heard. We just want to make records and try to figure out how to get them out there. I don't play in a band, and I didn't build the studio so I could make a vanity record. Jude [Cole] and I built it together, and it was really to start a label that was going to help young artists that might not be able to find their way in what is becoming a very shrinking corporate music industry and try to make records for them, and either get them out independently or actually use the distribution apparatus of a major."

— Kiefer Sutherland, Gibson

On May 26, 2015, Ironworks released Out of the Wasteland by Lifehouse.

== Artists ==
- Rocco DeLuca & The Burden
- Lifehouse
- Ron Sexsmith
- Billy Boy On Poison
- honeyhoney

== See also ==
- List of record labels
