= Jason Wade =

American singer and guitarist (born 1980)

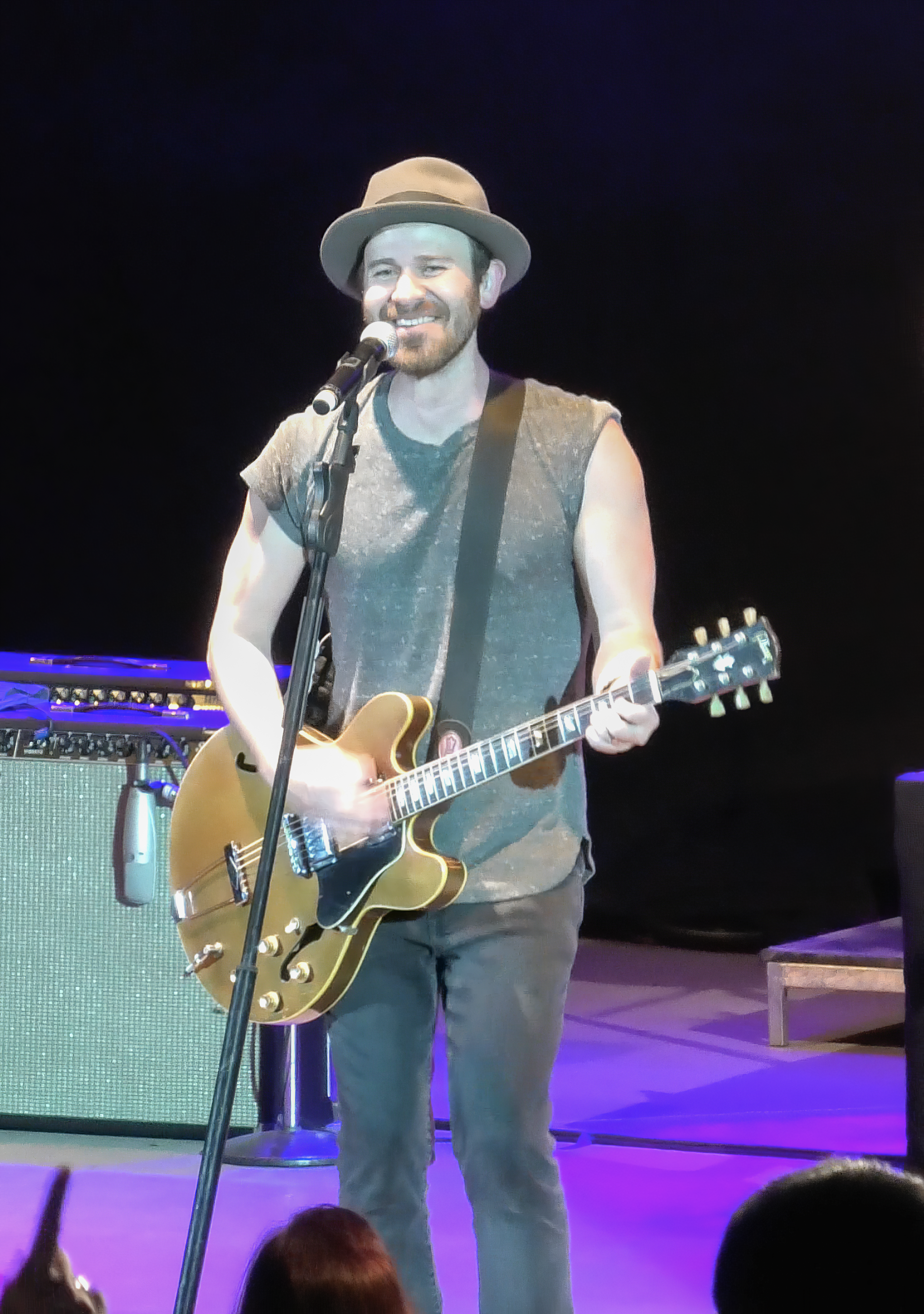
- Wade performing with Lifehouse in 2019

Background information
- Born: Jason Michael Wade; July 5, 1980 (age 46)
- Origin: Camarillo, California, U.S.
- Genres: Alternative rock; CCM
- Occupations: Singer; musician; songwriter
- Instruments: Vocals; guitar
- Years active: 1995–present
- Labels: DreamWorks; Geffen
- Member of: Blyss; Lifehouse; Øzwald
- Website: lifehousemusic.com

Jason Michael Wade (born July 5, 1980) is an American musician, best known as the lead vocalist and guitarist of the alternative rock band Lifehouse.

== Career ==
=== Lifehouse ===
At the age of 15, Wade co-founded Lifehouse (originally called Blyss) with neighbors Sergio Andrade and Rick Woolstenhulme. The band rose to fame when their debut album, No Name Face, was released in 2000. As of 2019, Lifehouse has sold more than 15 million singles and albums worldwide.

=== Solo work ===
Wade recorded a cover of "You Belong to Me" for the 2001 movie Shrek and its accompanying soundtrack.

He released a solo album entitled Paper Cuts in 2017. His followup LP, Ode to Silence, was released December 31, 2021.

=== ØZWALD ===
In 2018, Wade formed a band called ØZWALD with Lifehouse touring guitarist Steve Stout as a side project. The duo have released numerous singles, an EP of covers, and seven full-length albums: Sweet Delirium, Born in a State, Head Movies, For Polly Anna, Young Suburban Minds, Artificial Odyssey, and Garden of the Sun.

== Personal life ==
Jason Wade was born to Michael and Karen Wade. His father is a marriage counselor while his mother is a real estate agent. He has an older sister, Jamie. Wade's parents are divorced. After the divorce, he and his mother moved to Seattle. According to Wade, he used the Lifehouse song "You and Me" to propose to his then-girlfriend, Braeden, whom he married in 2001.

== Discography ==
Credited as	Album title	Year	Format
Blyss	Diff's Lucky Day	1999	LP
Jason Wade	You Belong to Me	2000	single
Lifehouse	No Name Face	2000	LP
Lifehouse	Stanley Climbfall	2002	LP
Lifehouse	Lifehouse	2005	LP
Lifehouse	Who We Are	2007	LP
Lifehouse	Smoke & Mirrors	2010	LP
Lifehouse	Almería	2012	LP
Lifehouse	Out of the Wasteland	2015	LP
Jason Wade	Paper Cuts	2017	LP
Jason Wade	Highways & Low Days	2017	EP
Jason Wade	Winzlo Vol. 1	2017	EP
ØZWALD	Sweet Delirium	2019	LP
Jason Wade	Gresham	2019	EP
ØZWALD	Covers, Vol. 1	2019	EP
ØZWALD	Born in a State	2019	LP
Jason Wade	Demos Vol. 1	2020	LP
Jason Wade	Open Up the Doors Again (Big Bright Day)	2020	Single
ØZWALD	Head Movies	2020	LP
ØZWALD	For Polly Anna	2020	LP
ØZWALD	Young Suburban Minds	2021	LP
Lifehouse	Goodbye Kanan	2021	EP
ØZWALD	Artificial Odyssey	2021	LP
Jason Wade	Ode to Silence	2021	LP
ØZWALD	Future Wars	2022	EP
ØZWALD	Sings the Beatles	2022	LP
ØZWALD	Garden of the Sun	2023	LP
ØZWALD	ELO WE <3 U	2023	EP
Jason Wade	A Likely Story	2024	LP
Jason Wade	Lullabies for Little Blue Eyes	2025	EP
