= Rick Woolstenhulme Jr. =

American drummer from Arizona

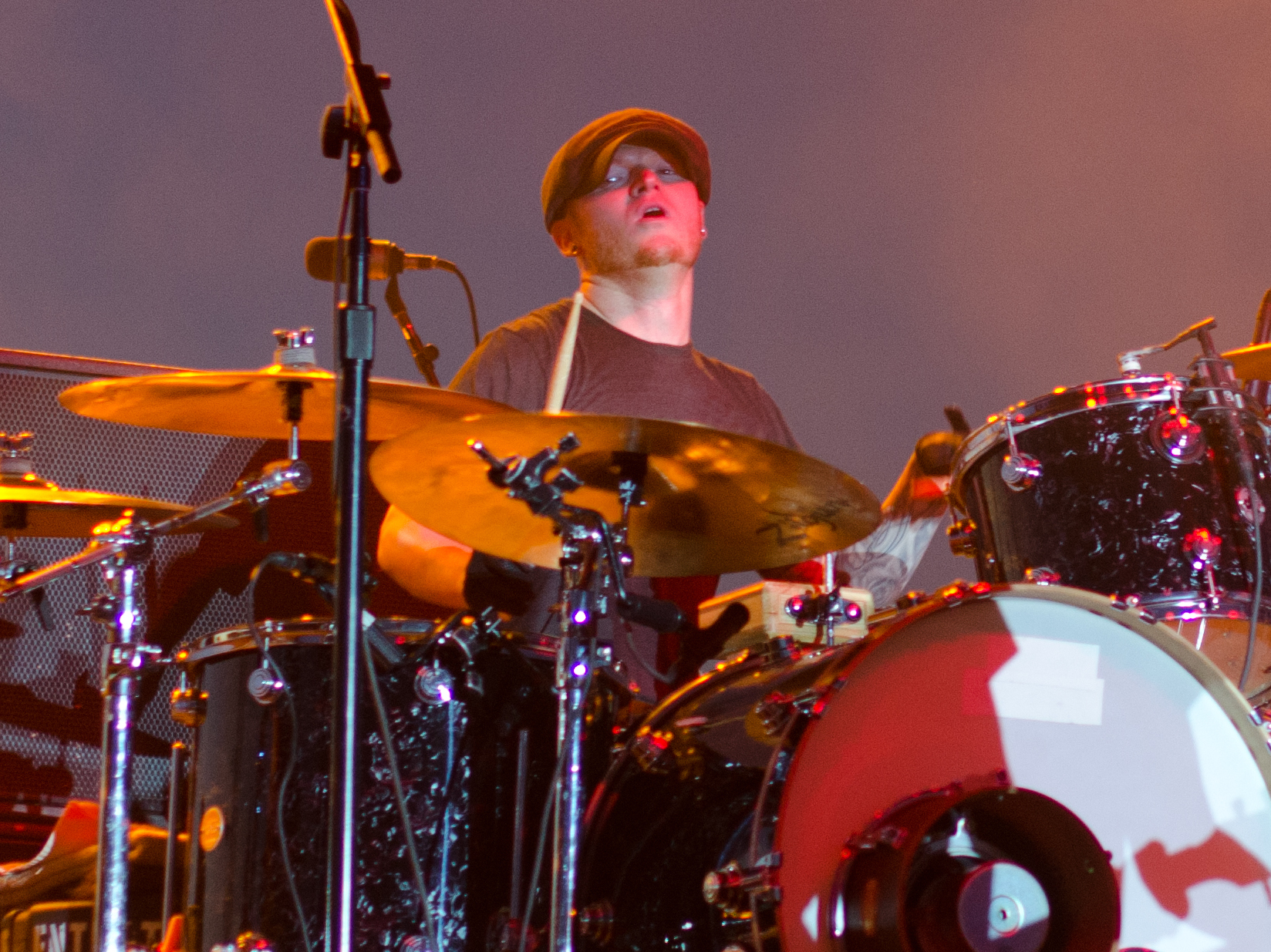
- Woolstenhulme performing with Lifehouse in 2013

Background information
- Born: Richard Robert Woolstenhulme Jr. September 20, 1979 (age 46); Gilbert, Arizona, U.S.
- Genres: Alternative rock
- Occupation: Musician
- Instrument: Drums
- Years active: 2000–present
- Labels: DreamWorks, Geffen
- Member of: Lifehouse

Richard Robert Woolstenhulme Jr. (born September 20, 1979) is an American musician who is the drummer of the alternative rock band Lifehouse.

== Early life and education ==
Woolstenhulme graduated from Gilbert High School in 1998, where he played football during his sophomore and junior years.

After his parents bought him a beat-up drum set Woolstenhulme started playing the drums; he was nine. He attended the Los Angeles Music Academy.

== Career ==
=== Lifehouse ===
While Woolstenhulme was in a music studio session, Lifehouse, then comprising Jason Wade and Sergio Andrade, was practicing in the adjacent room. Woolstenhulme, then playing with another band, bumped into them in the hallway. It was suggested that he check out Lifehouse, which was looking for a drummer to replace Jon "Diff" Palmer; in 2000, he joined the band.

Woolstenhulme has since performed on each Lifehouse recording.

=== Other musical work ===
In addition to his work with Lifehouse, he has performed on numerous recordings, including those of Shawn Colvin, Rihanna, Leigh Nash, Rocco Deluca, Britney Spears, Dave Matthews, and Palo Alto. He has also toured with Pearl Jam in 2001, Matchbox Twenty in 2002, The Rolling Stones in 2003, and various headlining tours since 2000. Beginning in 2013, Woolstenhulme toured with the Goo Goo Dolls following the departure of Mike Malinin.

=== Drum kit ===
For a while Woolstenhulme preferred Gretsch drums, playing a set that included a 24×14 bass drum, 13×9, 18×16 toms and a 14×6.5 hammered snare. He expressed a preference for Gretsch drums due to a better-quality sound. He currently uses a DW drum kit with Zildjian cymbals, a brand he has used consistently through his career.

== Personal life ==
Woolstenhulme's brother Sean Woolstenhulme is the ex-guitarist for the group The Calling, and briefly played with Lifehouse during their earlier years.

Woolstenhulme is married to Jenifer Hagio, a musician who co-wrote Michelle Branch's The Spirit Room. Branch introduced Woolstenhulme to Hagio.
