= Radio Le Mans =

English language radio service for the 24 Hours of Le Mans

Radio Le Mans is the English language radio service for the 24 Hours of Le Mans race, as well as for numerous other sports car events. It first broadcast at the 1987 24 Hours of Le Mans.

== History ==
The commentary was broadcast on local ('special event') radio in 1986. In 1987, it was headed by a sports car and radio enthusiast, Harry Turner, backed by Jim Tanner and Chris Crewe-Smith, founders of TTC radio. Backed by Silk Cut Jaguar the station quickly found favour with the tens of thousands of English-speaking fans at the race. The early years provided for only a very rudimentary service, no pit reports and a music loop played overnight.

Throughout the late 1980s and early 1990s, the station evolved adding new features like the 'Mad' Friday Campsite Tour in 1989. This show, conceived and presented by a newcomer, John Hindhaugh, was to prove almost as popular as the race coverage, and propelled Hindhaugh, with his distinctive North-Eastern accent and irreverent attitude, to a similar status with the fans as the commentary team. Resident statistician Paul Truswell, famed for not only remaining standing at his microphone throughout the 24 hours (and more) but also not urinating during this entire time, has been ever-present on the Radio Le Mans commentary team since 1988.

Haymarket Publications, publishers of Autosport had been involved almost from the start. At first only giving ad pages which were then "sold on" by Radio Le Mans to raise funds. When Studio 6 and Landon Brown, the first operators of the service, stepped aside Haymarket took over the running of the service and remained in control until 2005.

Radio Le Mans has been available to listeners at the circuit every year since 1987. In 1997 it began streaming on the internet.

From 2004 to 2006 the service was also available to digital satellite listeners, as it was carried on the Globecast Radio channel on the Sky Digital (UK & Ireland) platform in the UK. Globecast Radio also carried coverage of the American Le Mans Series. Globecast Radio ceased broadcasting in January 2007.

Since 2006 the service has been run by Radio Show Ltd., RSL was formed specifically to ensure the continuation of Radio Le Mans when Haymarket Publications declined to renew their contract with the ACO. RSL was given an initial five-year contract.

The website radiolemans.com now runs a sports car and automotive audio stream all year which includes live coverage of other races from around the world, including those of the FIA World Endurance Championship, European Le Mans Series, Nurburgring 24 and Britcar 24. In addition, there is an extensive, free archive of all of the Radio Show Limited broadcasts.

Over time new ways to listen to the Radio Le Mans coverage of the 24 hours were added. In 2008 the service was bundled with the Kangaroo TV system at Le Mans, (although that system has since ceased to exist), and in 2009 Radio Le Mans made its debut on Sirius satellite radio in the US and Canada.

RSL audio was also used as the narrative in the movies "Truth in 24" and the sequel, plus the 2013 Patrick Dempsey documentary which aired on Velocity in the USA in addition to appearing in vision in all of these productions, main presenter/commentator and owner John Hindhaugh provided commentary for the Jota documentary "Journey to Le Mans". As well as the Amazon Video series "Le Mans: Racing Is Everything" using Radio Le Mans audio for all of the commentary that was included over the six episodes as well as including interviews with John Hindhaugh.

Mid-2017, RSL rebranded their collection of radio broadcasts from Radio Le Mans to RS1, IMSA Radio to RS2 IMSA Radio and the creation of a new station, RS3, which like RS1 and RS2 broadcasts 24 hours a day. RS3, was previously RSL Extra, which only broadcast when required, in cases where three live events coincided. Reflecting this change of branding for the channels, the main portal was switched to www.radio-show.co.uk although the www.RadioLeMans.co domain is still active and RSL retain the licence, granted by the ACO, for the operation of Radio Le Mans on FM at the track.

== Le Mans 24 Hour presenters and commentators ==
Year	Commentators / Presenters / Reporters
1986	Public address commentators (French) plus Bob Constanduros
1987	Neville Hay, Richard Hay, Bob Constanduros
1988	Neville Hay, Ian Titchmarsh, Paul Truswell, Janice Minton, Andy Smith
1989	Ian Titchmarsh, Paul Truswell, John Hindhaugh, Steve Ancsell, Joe Saward, Bob Constanduros, Janice Minton
1990	Ian Titchmarsh, Paul Truswell, John Hindhaugh, Janice Minton, Martin Haven
1991	Ian Titchmarsh, Paul Truswell, Steve Ancsell, Martin Haven, Simon Maurice
1992	Paul Truswell, John Hindhaugh, Bob Constanduros, Steve Ancsell, Martin Haven
1993	Ian Titchmarsh, Paul Truswell, John Hindhaugh, Steve Ancsell, Janice Minton, Bob Constanduros, James Allen, Martin Haven
1994	Ian Titchmarsh, Paul Truswell, John Hindhaugh, Steve Ancsell, Bob Constanduros, Harry Turner
1995	Ian Titchmarsh, Paul Truswell, John Hindhaugh, Steve Ancsell, Harry Turner, Graham Tyler, Richard Riley
1996	Paul Truswell, John Hindhaugh
1997	Ian Titchmarsh, Paul Truswell, John Hindhaugh, Steve Ancsell
1998	Ian Titchmarsh, Paul Truswell, John Hindhaugh, Steve Ancsell
1999	Paul Truswell, John Hindhaugh, Ian Titchmarsh, David Addison, Gary Champion
2000	Paul Truswell, John Hindhaugh, Ian Titchmarsh, Gary Champion, Alan Hyde, Joe Bradley
2001	Paul Truswell, John Hindhaugh
2002	Paul Truswell, John Hindhaugh, Alan Hyde
2003	Paul Truswell, John Hindhaugh
2004	Paul Truswell, John Hindhaugh
2005	John Hindhaugh, Gary Champion, Holly Samos, Alan Hyde, Charles Dressing, Paul Truswell, Johnny Mowlem, Neville Hay, Joe Bradley, Graham Tyler, Henry Hope-Frost, Lucy Nell
2006	John Hindhaugh, Paul Truswell, Jim Roller, Gary Champion, Alan Hyde, Graham Tyler, Joe Bradley
2007	John Hindhaugh, Paul Truswell, Jim Roller, Charles Dressing, Gary Champion, Bruce Jones, Graham Tyler, Nick Daman, Henry Hope-Frost
2008	John Hindhaugh, Paul Truswell, Jim Roller, Charles Dressing, Graham Tyler, Joe Bradley, Bruce Jones, Nick Daman, Bob Constanduros, Paul Tarsey
2009	John Hindhaugh, Paul Truswell, Jim Roller, Charles Dressing, Graham Tyler, Joe Bradley, Bruce Jones, Nick Daman, Paul Tarsey, Johnny Mowlem.
2010	John Hindhaugh, Paul Truswell, Jim Roller, Charles Dressing, Graham Tyler, Joe Bradley, Graham Goodwin, Bruce Jones, Nick Daman, Paul Tarsey, Jonny Palmer.
2011	John Hindhaugh, Paul Truswell, Jim Roller, Charles Dressing, Graham Tyler, Joe Bradley, Graham Goodwin, Bruce Jones, Nick Daman, Paul Tarsey, Jonny Palmer.
2012	John Hindhaugh, Paul Truswell, Jim Roller, Charles Dressing, Joe Bradley, Graham Goodwin, Bruce Jones, Nick Daman, Paul Tarsey, Jonny Palmer, Sam Collins, Shea Adam
2013	John Hindhaugh, Paul Truswell, Jim Roller, Joe Bradley, Bruce Jones, Nick Daman, Paul Tarsey, Jonny Palmer, Sam Collins, Graham Goodwin, Shea Adam
2014	John Hindhaugh, Paul Truswell, Jim Roller, Joe Bradley, Bruce Jones, Nick Daman, Paul Tarsey, Jonny Palmer, Sam Collins, Graham Goodwin, Shea Adam
2015	John Hindhaugh, Paul Truswell, Jim Roller, Graham Goodwin, Joe Bradley, Bruce Jones, Nick Daman, Paul Tarsey, Jonny Palmer, Sam Collins, Shea Adam, Johnny Mowlem, Owen Mildenhall
2016	John Hindhaugh, Paul Truswell, Jim Roller, Graham Goodwin, Joe Bradley, Bruce Jones, Nick Daman, Paul Tarsey, Jonny Palmer, Sam Collins, Shea Adam, Owen Mildenhall
2017	John Hindhaugh, Paul Truswell, Ben Constanduros, Joe Bradley, Graham Goodwin, Bruce Jones, Nick Daman, Jonny Palmer, Sam Collins, Gemma Hatton, Alex Kapadia, Leena Gade, Shea Adam, Owen Mildenhall, Diana Binks
2018	John Hindhaugh, Paul Truswell, Joe Bradley, Graham Goodwin, Bruce Jones, Nick Daman, Jonny Palmer, Gemma Hatton, Leena Gade, Shea Adam, Johnny Mowlem, Diana Binks
2019	John Hindhaugh, Paul Truswell, Joe Bradley, Graham Goodwin, Bruce Jones, Nick Daman, Jonny Palmer, Shea Adam, Andrew Marriott, Diana Binks
2020	John Hindhaugh, Joe Bradley, Bruce Jones, Nick Daman, Jonny Palmer, Shea Adam, Andrew Marriott
2021	John Hindhaugh, Paul Truswell, Joe Bradley, Bruce Jones, Nick Daman, Jonny Palmer, Shea Adam, Peter Mackay, Andrew Marriott
2022	John Hindhaugh, Paul Truswell, Joe Bradley, Bruce Jones, Nick Daman, Jonny Palmer, Andrew Marriott
2023	John Hindhaugh, Paul Truswell, Joe Bradley, Bruce Jones, Nick Daman, Jonny Palmer, Johnny Mowlem, Diana Binks, Peter Snowdon, Richard Craill
2024	John Hindhaugh, Paul Truswell, Joe Bradley, Bruce Jones, Nick Daman, Jonny Palmer, Johnny Mowlem, Diana Binks, Peter Snowdon
2025	John Hindhaugh, Paul Truswell, Joe Bradley, Bruce Jones, Nick Daman, Jonny Palmer, Peter Mackay, Johnny Mowlem, Peter Snowdon, Ryan Myehrin
2026	John Hindhaugh, Paul Truswell, Joe Bradley, Bruce Jones, Nick Daman, Jonny Palmer, Peter Mackay, Peter Snowdon, Owen Mildenhall, Neil Cole

== Other race coverage ==
Radio Show Limited, the people behind Radio Le Mans, also provide internet radio commentary on every round of the American Le Mans Series, Le Mans Series, Nürburgring 24 hour race, and Silverstone 24 hour race. There is also coverage of other motorsport events, car tests, and motorsport magazine shows.

In August 2009, a sister channel called RLM Extra, later renamed to RSL Extra, was launched to allow for web streaming of two events simultaneously. This launched with coverage of the 2CV 24 hours from Snetterton, while the main channel ran coverage of the ALMS from Mid Ohio. However, with few clashing events this service wasn't used much after 2010. In 2016 it was used several times when IMSA and ELMS/Le Mans Cup races clashed.

In 2011 the 360 Motor Racing Club 6 Hour race was added to the list of events covered on Radio Le Mans.

In 2012 Radio Le Mans added coverage of the Dubai 24 Hours

2012 also saw RSL air live coverage of the Rolex 24 at Daytona for the first time. The team provided full 24-hour race commentary plus live coverage of all the practice and qualifying sessions, the only broadcaster to do so. The audio was also used for Motors TV's 15 hours of live television coverage, and on Speed.com as its overnight feed when the linear service was off air.

From 2013 onwards, Radio Le Mans covered the Bathurst 12 Hour.

Radio Le Mans began covering Creventic's 24H Series in 2015, which was also broadcast live on the English lingual MotorsTV and the live stream, as well as the Japanese Super GT series with the 3rd round of 2016 at Sportsland SUGO, streamed over live video on Nissan's NISMO.TV.

From 2017 onwards, Radio Le Mans will cover the German VLN championship making them the primary and only English commentary for the full series.

== American Le Mans Series radio ==
Since the first Petit Le Mans race in 1998, John Hindhaugh and other members of the Radio Le Mans team provided commentary of every round of the American Le Mans Series until the end of 2010 when the series decided to axe its radio coverage as part of its new TV contract.

In the year 2000, the team also covered two European Le Mans Series races, at Silverstone and the Nurburgring, and the Race of 1000 Years held in Adelaide, Australia.

The service, known as the American Le Mans Radio Network, is not only streamed on the internet but also carried on the Sirius satellite radio & XM satellite radio service, usually on XM144 Sport Nation.

The service is also broadcast at each track on 454 MHz, and occasionally also carried on local AM and FM stations.

After the ALMS axed its radio service at the end of 2010, Radio Le Mans continued to cover the races at Sebring and Petit Le Mans, which were also part of the Intercontinental Le Mans Cup, and Sebring in 2012 which was part of the FIA World Endurance Championship.

The ALMS merged with Grand-Am in 2014 to form the United Sports Car Championship, which was run by the International Motor Sport Association (IMSA). In 2015 IMSA and Radio Le Mans' owners RSL launched a radio service for the series called IMSA Radio.

== ALMS and IMSA radio commentators and reporters ==
Year	Play by play	Color commentator	Reporters
2019	John Hindhaugh; Brian Till (not Long Beach); Jonny Palmer (Daytona only)	Jeremy Shaw,	Shea Adam; Jamie Howe (Sebring); Joe Bradley (Daytona only); Bruce Jones (Daytona only); Andrew Marriott (Sebring only)
2018	John Hindhaugh; Jonny Palmer (Daytona only)	Jeremy Shaw, Owen Trinkler (Daytona only); Johnny Mowlem (Daytona only)	Shea Adam; Joe Bradley (Daytona only); Diana Binks (Daytona only); Andrew Marriott (Daytona only); Nick Daman (Road Atlanta only)
2017	John Hindhaugh; Jonny Palmer (Daytona only); Jim Roller (not Long Beach, Detroit, Mosport Park)	Jeremy Shaw, Graham Goodwin (Daytona only)	Shea Adam; Joe Bradley (Daytona only)
2016	John Hindhaugh (not Laguna Seca); Jonny Palmer (Daytona only); Jim Roller (not Long Beach)	Jeremy Shaw, Graham Goodwin (Daytona only)	Shea Adam; Joe Bradley (Daytona only)
2015	John Hindhaugh (not Laguna Seca); Greg Creamer; Jonny Palmer (Daytona only); Jim Roller (Daytona & Sebring)	Jeremy Shaw, Graham Goodwin (Daytona only)	Shea Adam (not Long Beach); Joe Bradley (Daytona only)
2012 (Sebring)	Martin Haven (qualifying); Jonny Palmer (race); Paul Truswell	Nick Daman	
2011 (Sebring & Petit Le Mans)	John Hindhaugh (Sebring); Martin Haven (PLM)	Jeremy Shaw (Sebring); Nick Daman (PLM)	Jamie Howe; Rick de Bruhl (Sebring)
2010	John Hindhaugh (except Mid Ohio); Greg Creamer (Mid Ohio)	Jeremy Shaw	Jamie Howe; Graham Tyler (Sebring only); Greg Creamer; Nick Daman (Petit Le Mans only)
2009	John Hindhaugh	Jeremy Shaw	Jamie Howe; Graham Tyler; Greg Creamer
2008	John Hindhaugh	Jeremy Shaw	Lindy Thackston; Nick Daman; Graham Tyler; Jamie Howe; Kelli Stavast
2007	John Hindhaugh (not Mazda Raceway Laguna Seca); Greg Creamer (Mazda Raceway Laguna Seca only)	Jeremy Shaw	Jamie Howe; Graham Tyler; Jim Martin; Bernadette Sanicola
2006	John Hindhaugh		Graham Tyler; Jamie Howe; Jeremy Shaw; Doug Kelly
2005	John Hindhaugh		Graham Tyler; Doug Kelly; Bill Adam; Joe Bradley
2004	John Hindhaugh		Graham Tyler; Doug Kelly; Bill Adam; Joe Bradley
2003	John Hindhaugh		Graham Tyler; Doug Kelly; Bill Adam; Joe Bradley
2002	John Hindhaugh		Joe Bradley; Jim Martyn
2001	John Hindhaugh		Joe Bradley; Jim Martyn
2000	John Hindhaugh		Jim Martyn; Joe Bradley; Jim Roller; Charles Dressing

== Le Mans Series, ILMC and FIA World Endurance Championship radio coverage ==
In 2008 Radio Le Mans began live coverage of the Le Mans Series, starting with the second round of the championship at Monza in Italy.

As with the American Le Mans Series the coverage was streamed on the internet, and at the Nürburgring and Silverstone it was also available locally on AM or FM frequencies.

In 2009 the opening round at Barcelona was again missed, due to a date clash with the American Le Mans Series, however, coverage resumed at Spa-Francorchamps for the second round of the series.

In 2010 all rounds of the championship were covered live, as was the ILMC race in China.

For 2011, all rounds of the ILMC and Le Mans Series were covered. In 2012 the ILMC was replaced by a new championship, the FIA World Endurance Championship. This and the Le Mans Series, now called the European Le Mans Series were both covered in full.

== ILMC, WEC & Le Mans Series commentators and reporters ==
Year	play by play	Color Commontators	Reporters
2008	John Hindhaugh	Graham Goodwin; Martin Haven (Nürburgring); Ian Titchmarsh (Silverstone)	Nick Daman; Graham Tyler; Joe Bradley (Silverstone)
2009	John Hindhaugh	Graham Goodwin	John Hindhaugh; Nick Daman; Graham Tyler
2010	John Hindhaugh	Graham Goodwin; Graham Tyler	John Hindhaugh; Nick Daman; Graham Tyler
2011	John Hindhaugh	Graham Goodwin; Graham Tyler (Le Castellet); Paul Truswell (Silverstone); Martin Haven (Silverstone, Petit Le Mans); Nick Daman (Petit Le Mans)	Nick Daman(Spa Imola Silverstone); Graham Tyler (Le Castellet); Jamie Howe (Sebring); Rick de Bruhl (Sebring)
2012 WEC (excludes details for Le Mans 24 hours, which can be found above)	John Hindhaugh (not Sebring); Martin Haven (Sebring); Jonny Palmer; Jim Roller	Graham Goodwin; Paul Truswell	Nick Daman; Louise Beckett
2012 ELMS	John Hindhaugh; Jonny Palmer	Graham Goodwin; Paul Truswell	Nick Daman
2013 WEC (excludes details for Le Mans 24 hours, which can be found above)	John Hindhaugh; Jonny Palmer (not Spa)	Paul Truswell; Graham Goodwin	Nick Daman; Bruce Jones (Silverstone only)
2013 ELMS	Jonny Palmer; John Hindhaugh (Silverstone only); Paul Truswell (Silverstone only)	Graham Goodwin (Silverstone); Paul Truswell (Silverstone only); Nick Daman (Imola)	Nick Daman and Bruce Jones (Silverstone); Justine Monnier (Imola)
2014 WEC (excludes details for 24 Hours of Le Mans, which can be found above)	John Hindhaugh (Silverstone and Spa only); Jonny Palmer (not Spa)	Paul Truswell (not Silverstone); Bruce Jones (not Spa); Graham Goodwin (Silverstone only)	Nick Daman (Silverstone); Joe Bradley (Silverstone)
2014 ELMS	Jonny Palmer	Bruce Jones	Nick Daman (Silverstone); Joe Bradley (Silverstone)
2015 WEC (excludes details for 24 Hours of Le Mans, which can be found above)	Jonny Palmer	Bruce Jones; Paul Truswell (not Silverstone); Alex Brundle	Nick Daman (Silverstone); Joe Bradley (Silverstone)
2015 ELMS	Jonny Palmer (not Silverstone); John Hindhaugh (Silverstone only)	Bruce Jones (not Silverstone); Paul Truswell (not Silverstone); Martin Haven (Silverstone)	Nick Daman (Silverstone); Joe Bradley (Silverstone); Charlie George (not Silverstone)
2016 WEC (excludes details for 24 Hours of Le Mans, which can be found above)	Jonny Palmer (not Silverstone, Mexico); Bruce Jones (Silverstone, Mexico)	Paul Truswell; Alex Brundle (Spa only)	Nick Daman (Silverstone); Joe Bradley (Silverstone)
2016 ELMS	Jonny Palmer (not Silverstone); John Hindhaugh (Silverstone only)	Bruce Jones (not Silverstone); Paul Truswell (Silverstone)	Nick Daman (Silverstone); Joe Bradley (Silverstone); Charlie George (not Silverstone)
2017 WEC (excludes details for 24 Hours of Le Mans, which can be found above)	Jonny Palmer; Bruce Jones (Fuji only); John Hindhaugh (Silverstone, Shanghai, Nürburgring only)	Paul Truswell; Alex Kapadia (Spa only); Ollie Gavin (CotA only)	Bruce Jones (Silverstone)
2017 ELMS	Jonny Palmer; John Hindhaugh (Silverstone only)	Graham Goodwin (not Silverstone, Portimao); Bruce Jones (Portimao only); Paul Truswell (Silverstone)	Nick Daman (Silverstone); Joe Bradley (Silverstone); Charlie George (not Silverstone)
2018 ELMS	Jonny Palmer (not Monza, Silverstone); Richard Craill (Silverstone only)	Graham Goodwin (not Silverstone); Alex Brundle (Monza)	Nick Daman (Silverstone); Joe Bradley (Silverstone); Charlie George (not Silverstone)
2018-19 WEC (excludes details for 24 Hours of Le Mans, which can be found above)	Jonny Palmer; John Hindhaugh (Sebring only)	Paul Truswell (not Shanghai); Alex Brundle (Spa only); Alex Kapadia (Shanghai only)	Diana Binks (Silverstone only); Joe Bradley (Silverstone only); Andrew Marriott (Silverstone, Sebring only)); Louise Beckett
2019 ELMS	Jonny Palmer	Graham Goodwin	Louise Beckett
2020 WEC	Jonny Palmer	Bruce Jones (not Paul Ricard); John Hindhaugh (Paul Ricard only)	Louise Beckett; Duncan Vincent
2020 ELMS	Jonny Palmer	Bruce Jones	Hayley Edmunds
2021 WEC	Jonny Palmer	Bruce Jones; John Hindhaugh	Louise Beckett; Duncan Vincent
2021 ELMS	Jonny Palmer	Graham Goodwin	Hayley Edmunds

== Nürburgring 24 hours radio coverage ==
Radio Le Mans first covered the Nürburgring 24 hours race as part of its Le Mans 24 hour coverage in 2006 (the races ran on the same dates that year).

The following year saw the first English-language commentary of the race, however, unlike the Le Mans commentary this did not run for the full 24 hours but stopped for six hours during the night. That year the race itself stopped for a time during the night as thick fog caused a red flag period.

The Nürburgring 24 hours was successful enough that it has been repeated in 2008 and 2009, but using the same format of covering the first ten, and final eight hours of the race, rather than the full 24 hours. However, in 2010 the entire race was broadcast live with John Hindhaugh, Paul Truswell and Graham Goodwin pulling out almost a 24-hour live shift. The same was repeated in 2011, with Jim Roller joining the commentary trio once again.

Unlike the former Le Mans Series race at the Nürburgring, coverage of the Nürburgring 24 hours is not simulcast on FM. It is only available online.

== Nürburgring 24 hours commentators ==
Year	Play by play	Color Commentator
2007	John Hindhaugh; Jim Roller	Graham Goodwin
2008	John Hindhaugh; Paul Truswell	Johannes Gauglica; Graham Goodwin
2009	John Hindhaugh; Paul Truswell	Graham Goodwin
2010	John Hindhaugh; Paul Truswell	Graham Goodwin
2011	John Hindhaugh; Paul Truswell; Jim Roller	Graham Goodwin
2012	John Hindhaugh; Paul Truswell; Jonny Palmer	Graham Goodwin
2013	John Hindhaugh; Paul Truswell; Jim Roller	Graham Goodwin

== Sim racing ==
As motorsport was suspended during the COVID-19 pandemic, Radio Show Limited has produced sim racing broadcasts for IMSA WeatherTech SportsCar Championship and the Nurburgring Endurance Series.
