= 2015 SportsCar Grand Prix =

Canadian Tire Motorsport Park

The 2015 Mobil 1 SportsCar Grand Prix presented by Hawk Performance was a professional sports car racing event held at Canadian Tire Motorsport Park near Bowmanville, Ontario on July 12, 2015. The race was the seventh round of the 2015 United SportsCar Championship season and the event marked the 30th IMSA sanctioned sports car race held at the facility.

== Background ==
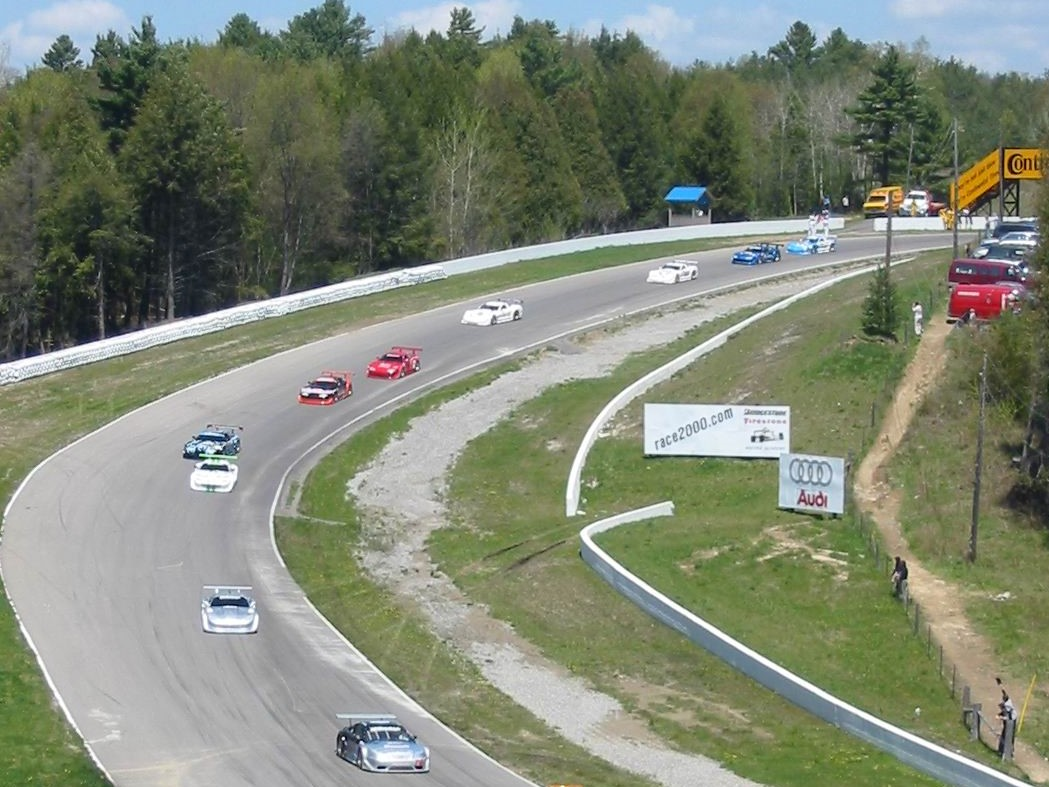
Canadian Tire Motorsports Park, where the race was held.

International Motor Sports Association (IMSA) president Scott Atherton confirmed the race was part of the schedule for the 2015 IMSA Tudor United SportsCar Championship (IMSA TUSC) in August 2014. It was the second consecutive year the event was held as part of the Tudor United SportsCar Championship. The 2015 SportsCar Grand Prix was the seventh of twelve scheduled sports car races of 2015 by IMSA, and was the fourth round not held on the held as part of the North American Endurance Cup. The race was held at the ten-turn 2.459 mi (3.957 km) Canadian Tire Motorsports Park in Bowmanville, Ontario, Canada on July 12, 2015. For 2015, the Tudor Championship race featured the Prototype (P) and GT Le Mans (GTLM) classes alongside the Prototype Challenge (PC) class which replaced the GT Daytona (GTD) class which competed at the 2014 edition of the Grand Prix. The weekend also included races for the Continental Tire SportsCar Challenge, Cooper Tires Prototype Lites, Porsche GT3 Cup Challenge USA, and the Mazda MX-5 Cup.

== Entries ==
A total of 23 cars took part in the event split across 3 classes. 8 cars were entered in P, 7 in PC, and in 8 GTLM. In P, SpeedSource elected to run one entry for the third consecutive race. In PC, Mirco Schultis returned to the Starworks Motorsport entry. Matt McMurry joined Mikhail Goikhberg in the JDC-Miller MotorSports entry.

== Practice ==
There were three practice sessions preceding the start of the race on Saturday, two on Friday and one on Saturday. The first two one-hour sessions were on Friday morning and afternoon. The third on Saturday morning lasted an hour.

=== Practice 1 ===
The first practice session took place at 11:20 am ET on Friday and ended with Ricky Taylor topping the charts for Wayne Taylor Racing, with a lap time of 1:10.451.

Pos.	Class	No.	Team	Driver	Time	Gap
1	P	10	Wayne Taylor Racing	Ricky Taylor	1:10.451	_
2	P	60	Michael Shank Racing with Curb/Agajanian	Oswaldo Negri Jr.	1:10.616	+0.165
3	P	31	Action Express Racing	Dane Cameron	1:10.660	+0.209

=== Practice 2 ===
The second practice session took place at 4:00 pm ET on Friday and ended with Oswaldo Negri Jr. topping the charts for Michael Shank Racing with Curb/Agajanian, with a lap time of 1:09.216.

Pos.	Class	No.	Team	Driver	Time	Gap
1	P	60	Michael Shank Racing with Curb/Agajanian	Oswaldo Negri Jr.	1:09.216	_
2	P	10	Wayne Taylor Racing	Ricky Taylor	1:09.879	+0.663
3	P	31	Action Express Racing	Dane Cameron	1:10.174	+0.958

=== Practice 3 ===
The third and final practice session took place at 10:00 am ET on Saturday and ended with Oswaldo Negri Jr. topping the charts for Michael Shank Racing with Curb/Agajanian, with a lap time of 1:09.168.

Pos.	Class	No.	Team	Driver	Time	Gap
1	P	60	Michael Shank Racing with Curb/Agajanian	Oswaldo Negri Jr.	1:09.168	_
2	P	31	Action Express Racing	Dane Cameron	1:09.645	+0.477
3	P	5	Action Express Racing	Christian Fittipaldi	1:09.709	+0.119

== Qualifying ==
Qualifying was broken into three sessions. The first session of qualifying was for the GTLM class. Nick Tandy qualified on pole in GTLM driving the No. 911 Porsche North America entry.

The second session of qualifying was for the PC class. James French qualified on pole driving the No. 38 Performance Tech Motorsports entry.

The final session of qualifying was for the P class. Ricky Taylor qualified on pole driving the No. 10 car for Wayne Taylor Racing.

=== Qualifying results ===
Pole positions in each class are indicated in bold and by ‡.

Pos.	Class	No.	Team	Driver	Time	Gap	Grid
1	**P**	**10**	**(United States) Wayne Taylor Racing**	**(United States) Ricky Taylor**	**1:09.705**	**_**	1‡
2	P	5	(United States) Action Express Racing	(Brazil) Christian Fittipaldi	1:09.864	+0.159	2
3	P	01	(United States) Chip Ganassi Racing	(United States) Scott Pruett	1:10.138	+0.433	3
4	P	90	(United States) VisitFlorida.com Racing	(Canada) Michael Valiante	1:10.399	+0.694	4
5	P	31	(United States) Action Express Racing	(United States) Eric Curran	1:10.508	+0.803	5
6	P	60	(United States) Michael Shank Racing with Curb/Agajanian	(United States) John Pew	1:10.725	+1.020	6
7	P	0	(United States) DeltaWing Racing Cars with Claro/TracFone	(United Kingdom) Katherine Legge	1:11.276	+1.571	7
8	P	07	(United States) SpeedSource	(United States) Tom Long	1:12.629	+2.924	8
9	**PC**	**38**	**(United States) Performance Tech Motorsports**	**(United States) James French**	**1:12.667**	**+2.962**	9‡
10	PC	11	(United States) RSR Racing	(Canada) Chris Cumming	1:12.699	+2.994	10
11	PC	54	(United States) CORE Autosport	(United States) Jon Bennett	1:13.007	+3.302	11
12	PC	52	(United States) PR1/Mathiasen Motorsports	(United States) Mike Guasch	1:13.022	+3.317	12
13	PC	85	(United States) JDC-Miller MotorSports	(Canada) Mikhail Goikhberg	1:13.169	+3.464	13
14	PC	16	(United States) BAR1 Motorsports	(United States) John Falb	1:13.220	+3.515	14
15	PC	8	(United States) Starworks Motorsport	(Germany) Mirco Schultis	1:14.458	+4.753	15
16	**GTLM**	**911**	**(United States) Porsche North America**	**(United Kingdom) Nick Tandy**	**1:14.829**	**+5.124**	16‡
17	GTLM	25	(United States) BMW Team RLL	(Germany) Dirk Werner	1:14.857	+5.152	17
18	GTLM	24	(United States) BMW Team RLL	(Germany) Lucas Luhr	1:14.984	+5.279	18
19	GTLM	62	(United States) Risi Competizione	(Germany) Pierre Kaffer	1:15.298	+5.593	19
20	GTLM	3	(United States) Corvette Racing	(Denmark) Jan Magnussen	1:15.325	+5.620	20
21	GTLM	912	(United States) Porsche North America	(Germany) Jörg Bergmeister	1:15.386	+5.681	21
22	GTLM	4	(United States) Corvette Racing	(United Kingdom) Oliver Gavin	1:15.463	+5.758	22
23	GTLM	17	(United States) Team Falken Tire	(United States) Bryan Sellers	1:15.544	+5.839	23

== Report ==
=== Race summary ===
The race was won overall by Jordan Taylor and Ricky Taylor, driving a Corvette Daytona Prototype for Wayne Taylor Racing. They finished just ahead of a similar car driven by Action Express Racing pairing Dane Cameron and Eric Curran, while the podium was completed by the Ligier JS P2 of Michael Shank Racing, driven by Oswaldo Negri Jr. and John Pew. In eighth place overall, CORE Autosport won the Prototype Challenge class with drivers Jon Bennett and Colin Braun, while the GT Le Mans honors were taken by Porsche North America – run by CORE Autosport – in twelfth place overall, with a Porsche 911 RSR driven by Patrick Pilet and Nick Tandy.

=== Race results ===
Final race classification
Pos	Class	No.	Team	Drivers	Chassis	Tire	Laps
Pos	Class	No.	Team	Drivers	Engine	Tire	Laps
1	P	10	(United States) Wayne Taylor Racing	(United States) Ricky Taylor (United States) Jordan Taylor	Chevrolet Corvette DP	C	128
1	P	10	(United States) Wayne Taylor Racing	(United States) Ricky Taylor (United States) Jordan Taylor	Chevrolet LS9 5.5 L V8	C	128
2	P	31	(United States) Action Express Racing	(United States) Eric Curran (United States) Dane Cameron	Coyote Chevrolet Corvette DP	C	128
2	P	31	(United States) Action Express Racing	(United States) Eric Curran (United States) Dane Cameron	Chevrolet LS9 5.5 L V8	C	128
3	P	60	(United States) Michael Shank Racing with Curb/Agajanian	(United States) John Pew (Brazil) Oswaldo Negri Jr.	Ligier JS P2	C	128
3	P	60	(United States) Michael Shank Racing with Curb/Agajanian	(United States) John Pew (Brazil) Oswaldo Negri Jr.	Honda HR28TT 2.8 L Turbo V6	C	128
4	P	90	(United States) VisitFlorida.com Racing	(United Kingdom) Richard Westbrook (Canada) Michael Valiante	Chevrolet Corvette DP	C	128
4	P	90	(United States) VisitFlorida.com Racing	(United Kingdom) Richard Westbrook (Canada) Michael Valiante	Chevrolet LS9 5.5 L V8	C	128
5	P	5	(United States) Action Express Racing	(Portugal) João Barbosa (Brazil) Christian Fittipaldi	Chevrolet Corvette DP	C	128
5	P	5	(United States) Action Express Racing	(Portugal) João Barbosa (Brazil) Christian Fittipaldi	Chevrolet LS9 5.5 L V8	C	128
6	P	01	(United States) Chip Ganassi Racing with Felix Sabates	(United States) Joey Hand (United States) Scott Pruett	Riley MkXXVI	C	127
6	P	01	(United States) Chip Ganassi Racing with Felix Sabates	(United States) Joey Hand (United States) Scott Pruett	Ford EcoBoost 3.5 L Turbo V6	C	127
7	P	07	(United States) SpeedSource	(United States) Tom Long (United States) Joel Miller	Mazda Prototype	C	126
7	P	07	(United States) SpeedSource	(United States) Tom Long (United States) Joel Miller	Mazda Skyactiv-D 2.2 L Turbo I4 (Diesel)	C	126
8	PC	54	(United States) CORE Autosport	(United States) Jon Bennett (United States) Colin Braun	Oreca FLM09	C	125
8	PC	54	(United States) CORE Autosport	(United States) Jon Bennett (United States) Colin Braun	Chevrolet 6.2 L V8	C	125
9	P	0	(United States) DeltaWing Racing Cars with Claro/TracFone	(Mexico) Memo Rojas (United Kingdom) Katherine Legge	DeltaWing DWC13	C	125
9	P	0	(United States) DeltaWing Racing Cars with Claro/TracFone	(Mexico) Memo Rojas (United Kingdom) Katherine Legge	Élan 1.9 L Turbo I4	C	125
10	PC	16	(United States) BAR1 Motorsports	(United States) John Falb (United States) Sean Rayhall	Oreca FLM09	C	124
10	PC	16	(United States) BAR1 Motorsports	(United States) John Falb (United States) Sean Rayhall	Chevrolet 6.2 L V8	C	124
11	PC	85	(United States) JDC-Miller MotorSports	(Canada) Mikhail Goikhberg (United States) Matt McMurry	Oreca FLM09	C	123
11	PC	85	(United States) JDC-Miller MotorSports	(Canada) Mikhail Goikhberg (United States) Matt McMurry	Chevrolet 6.2 L V8	C	123
12	GTLM	911	(United States) Porsche North America	(United Kingdom) Nick Tandy (France) Patrick Pilet	Porsche 911 RSR	M	122
12	GTLM	911	(United States) Porsche North America	(United Kingdom) Nick Tandy (France) Patrick Pilet	Porsche 4.0 L Flat-6	M	122
13	GTLM	24	(United States) BMW Team RLL	(United States) John Edwards (Germany) Lucas Luhr	BMW Z4 GTE	M	122
13	GTLM	24	(United States) BMW Team RLL	(United States) John Edwards (Germany) Lucas Luhr	BMW 4.4 L V8	M	122
14	GTLM	3	(United States) Corvette Racing	(Denmark) Jan Magnussen (Spain) Antonio García	Chevrolet Corvette C7.R	M	122
14	GTLM	3	(United States) Corvette Racing	(Denmark) Jan Magnussen (Spain) Antonio García	Chevrolet LT5.5 5.5 L V8	M	122
15	GTLM	25	(United States) BMW Team RLL	(United States) Bill Auberlen (Germany) Dirk Werner	BMW Z4 GTE	M	122
15	GTLM	25	(United States) BMW Team RLL	(United States) Bill Auberlen (Germany) Dirk Werner	BMW 4.4 L V8	M	122
16	PC	11	(United States) RSR Racing	(Brazil) Bruno Junqueira (Canada) Chris Cumming	Oreca FLM09	C	122
16	PC	11	(United States) RSR Racing	(Brazil) Bruno Junqueira (Canada) Chris Cumming	Chevrolet 6.2 L V8	C	122
17	GTLM	4	(United States) Corvette Racing	(United Kingdom) Oliver Gavin (United States) Tommy Milner	Chevrolet Corvette C7.R	M	122
17	GTLM	4	(United States) Corvette Racing	(United Kingdom) Oliver Gavin (United States) Tommy Milner	Chevrolet LT5.5 5.5 L V8	M	122
18	GTLM	62	(United States) Risi Competizione	(Germany) Pierre Kaffer (Italy) Giancarlo Fisichella	Ferrari 458 Italia GT2	M	122
18	GTLM	62	(United States) Risi Competizione	(Germany) Pierre Kaffer (Italy) Giancarlo Fisichella	Ferrari 4.5 L V8	M	122
19	GTLM	912	(United States) Porsche North America	(Germany) Jörg Bergmeister (New Zealand) Earl Bamber	Porsche 911 RSR	M	121
19	GTLM	912	(United States) Porsche North America	(Germany) Jörg Bergmeister (New Zealand) Earl Bamber	Porsche 4.0 L Flat-6	M	121
20 DNF	PC	52	(United States) PR1/Mathiasen Motorsports	(United States) Mike Guasch (United Kingdom) Tom Kimber-Smith	Oreca FLM09	C	104
20 DNF	PC	52	(United States) PR1/Mathiasen Motorsports	(United States) Mike Guasch (United Kingdom) Tom Kimber-Smith	Chevrolet 6.2 L V8	C	104
21 DNF	GTLM	17	(United States) Team Falken Tire	(United States) Bryan Sellers (Germany) Wolf Henzler	Porsche 911 RSR	F	103
21 DNF	GTLM	17	(United States) Team Falken Tire	(United States) Bryan Sellers (Germany) Wolf Henzler	Porsche 4.0 L Flat-6	F	103
22 DNF	PC	8	(United States) Starworks Motorsport	(Netherlands) Renger van der Zande (Germany) Mirco Schultis	Oreca FLM09	C	101
22 DNF	PC	8	(United States) Starworks Motorsport	(Netherlands) Renger van der Zande (Germany) Mirco Schultis	Chevrolet 6.2 L V8	C	101
23 DNF	PC	38	(United States) Performance Tech Motorsports	(United States) James French (United States) Conor Daly	Oreca FLM09	C	86
23 DNF	PC	38	(United States) Performance Tech Motorsports	(United States) James French (United States) Conor Daly	Chevrolet 6.2 L V8	C	86

Tyre manufacturers
Key
Symbol	Tyre manufacturer
C	Continental
M	Michelin
F	Falken Tire

== Media ==
=== Television ===
The race was broadcast live by Fox Sports on Fox Sports 1 in the United States and on Fox Sports Racing in Canada, Puerto Rico and the Caribbean. The event was televised internationally by Motors TV in Europe and Network Ten in Australia.

United SportsCar Championship on Fox Sports
Booth Announcers		Pit reporters
Announcer	Bob Varsha	Brian Till; Jamie Howe
Color	Calvin Fish; Justin Bell	Brian Till; Jamie Howe

=== Radio ===
The race was broadcast by IMSA Radio with announcers John Hindhaugh and Jeremy Shaw calling the race on IMSA.tv and radiolemans.com, which was simulcast on Sirius channel 117 satellite radio and on 90.7 FM at the track.

IMSA Radio
Booth Announcers		Pit reporters
Announcer	John Hindhaugh	Shea Adam; Greg Creamer
Color	Jeremy Shaw	Shea Adam; Greg Creamer

== Support race results ==
CTSC			Prototype Lites	GT3 Cup USA	MX-5 Cup
GS	(United States) Jade Buford (United States) Austin Cindric	Race 1	(United States) Kenton Koch	(United States) Elliott Skeer	(United States) Chad McCumbee
ST	(United States) Spencer Pumpelly (United States) Luis Rodriguez Jr.	Race 2	(United States) Clark Toppe	(United States) Elliott Skeer	(United States) Patrick Gallagher

United SportsCar Championship
Previous race: 6 Hours of The Glen	2015 season	Next race: Northeast Grand Prix
