= Anna Cookson =

British journalist and radio presenter

Anna Cookson is a British radio presenter, working at BBC Radio Kent.

== Background ==
Cookson was raised in Eltham, London.

== Career ==
Very early in her career, Cookson taught children in Tanzania for a short period. She attended university in Nottingham, staying in the city because she worked at the BBC there. As of 2007, Cookson was a presenter at Passion Radio in Oxford. While at Passion Radio, she was heard on the station's breakfast show.

From 2008 until 2010, Cookson was a broadcast journalist at radio stations owned by the Global media group, and in the early 2010s she spent brief periods as a presenter at local radio stations in the Home counties.

Cookson was a presenter at QVC television in the UK from 2010 until 2013. As of 2010, she stood in on the early breakfast show on BBC Radio Oxford. She presented on Premier Radio in the 2010s. She also sat in for other presenters on BBC Radio London during the 2010s. Cookson presented programmes on BBC Radio London during holiday periods, starting in 2015 and ending in 2017. As of 2016, she was heard on LBC. As of 2017, she was a reporter at BBC Radio 5 Live.

In mid-2017, Cookson joined BBC Radio Kent to present the weekday breakfast show with John Warnett.

In late 2018, she was joined by Ian Collins as co-presenter, who took over from John Warnett. In 2020, as a result of changes to BBC Local Radio made in response to the coronavirus pandemic, the length of the show was extended, and the show was broadcast between 6am and 10am; Cookson also became the sole presenter of the show.

Cookson is the co-author, alongside her father Paul Cookson, of a play aimed at children that explores the parable of the Good Samaritan in a modern way. She is also the author of two novels. In November 2019, she began being a national ambassador for the Neighbourhood Prayer Network.

== Personal life ==
Cookson likes travelling and running. She is married.
