= 2015 6 Hours of Silverstone =

Sports car endurance race held in England

(United Kingdom) 2015 6 Hours of Silverstone
Event information
- Round 1 of 8 in the 2015 FIA World Endurance Championship
- Date: 12 April 2015
- Location: Silverstone
- Venue: Silverstone Circuit
- Duration: 6 Hours

Results
- Laps completed: 201
- Distance (km): 1184.091
- Distance (miles): 735.861
- LMP1

Pole position
- Time: 1:39.721
- Team: (Germany) Porsche Team
- Drivers: (New Zealand) Brendon Hartley (Australia) Mark Webber

Winners
- Team: (Germany) Audi Sport Team Joest
- Drivers: (Germany) André Lotterer (Switzerland) Marcel Fässler (France) Benoît Tréluyer
- LMP2

Winners
- Team: (Russia) G-Drive Racing
- Drivers: (United Kingdom) Sam Bird (France) Julien Canal (Russia) Roman Rusinov
- LMGTE Pro

Winners
- Team: (Italy) AF Corse
- Drivers: (Italy) Gianmaria Bruni (Finland) Toni Vilander
- LMGTE Am

Winners
- Team: (United Kingdom) Aston Martin Racing
- Drivers: (Canada) Paul Dalla Lana (Portugal) Pedro Lamy (Austria) Mathias Lauda

The 2015 6 Hours of Silverstone was a six-hour endurance sports car racing event held for Le Mans Prototype and Le Mans Grand Touring Endurance cars at the Silverstone Circuit near Silverstone, Northamptonshire, England on 12 April 2015 before a crowd of 45,000 spectators. The event served as the opening round of the 2015 World Endurance Championship; it was fourth running of the event as part of the championship.

A Porsche 919 Hybrid of Timo Bernhard, Brendon Hartley and Mark Webber qualified in pole position by setting the fastest lap in class. They led for the opening 80 minutes until they suffered a terminal rear drivetrain failure, promoting their teammates Marc Lieb, Neel Jani and Romain Dumas to first position. Thereafter, the trio battled an Audi R18 e-tron quattro shared by André Lotterer, Marcel Fässler and Benoît Tréluyer for the lead throughout much of the event. Although the No. 7 tean took a 10-second stop-and-go penalty for a track limits transgression in the final 14 minutes, they finished first to achieve Lotterer, Fässler and Tréluyer's ninth overall career victory in a record-breaking distance of 201 laps. Lieb, Dumas and Jani finished second and a Toyota TS040 Hybrid driven by Sébastien Buemi, Kazuki Nakajima and Anthony Davidson was third.

The Le Mans Prototype 2 (LMP2) category was won by the G-Drive Racing Ligier JS P2 car shared by Roman Rusinov, Julien Canal and Sam Bird, which took the lead from the fast-starting KCMG Oreca 05 of Nick Tandy, Matthew Howson and Richard Bradley on lap six and held it for most of the race to win by one-lap over the sister crew of Gustavo Yacamán, Ricardo González and Pipo Derani which started from pole position. The AF Corse Ferrari 458 Italia GTE of Gianmaria Bruni and Toni Vilander passed their teammates James Calado and Davide Rigon following a battle during the race's fourth houro win the Le Mans Grand Touring Professional (LMGTE Pro) class. The second-placed car was the Porsche Team Manthey 911 RSR shared by Richard Lietz and Michael Christensen. The Le Mans Grand Touring Amateur (LMGTE Am) category was won by Paul Dalla Lana, Pedro Lamy and Mathias Lauda in an Aston Martin Racing V8 Vantage GTE by 13.712 seconds over the AF Corse Ferrari team of Rui Águas, Emmanuel Collard and François Perrodo.

The final results gave Lotterer, Fässler and Tréluyer an early Drivers' Championship lead with 25 points, seven ahead of Lieb, Jani and Dumas and a further three in front of Buemi, Nakajima and Davidson. Their teammates Mike Conway, Stéphane Sarrazin and Alexander Wurz were fourth on 12 points, and Loïc Duval, Lucas di Grassi and Oliver Jarvis were fifth with 10 points. Audi took the early lead of the Manufacturers' Championship with 35 points, seven points ahead of Toyota in second; the third-placed manufacturer Porsche had scored 19 points with seven rounds left in the season.

== Background ==
=== Entry list ===
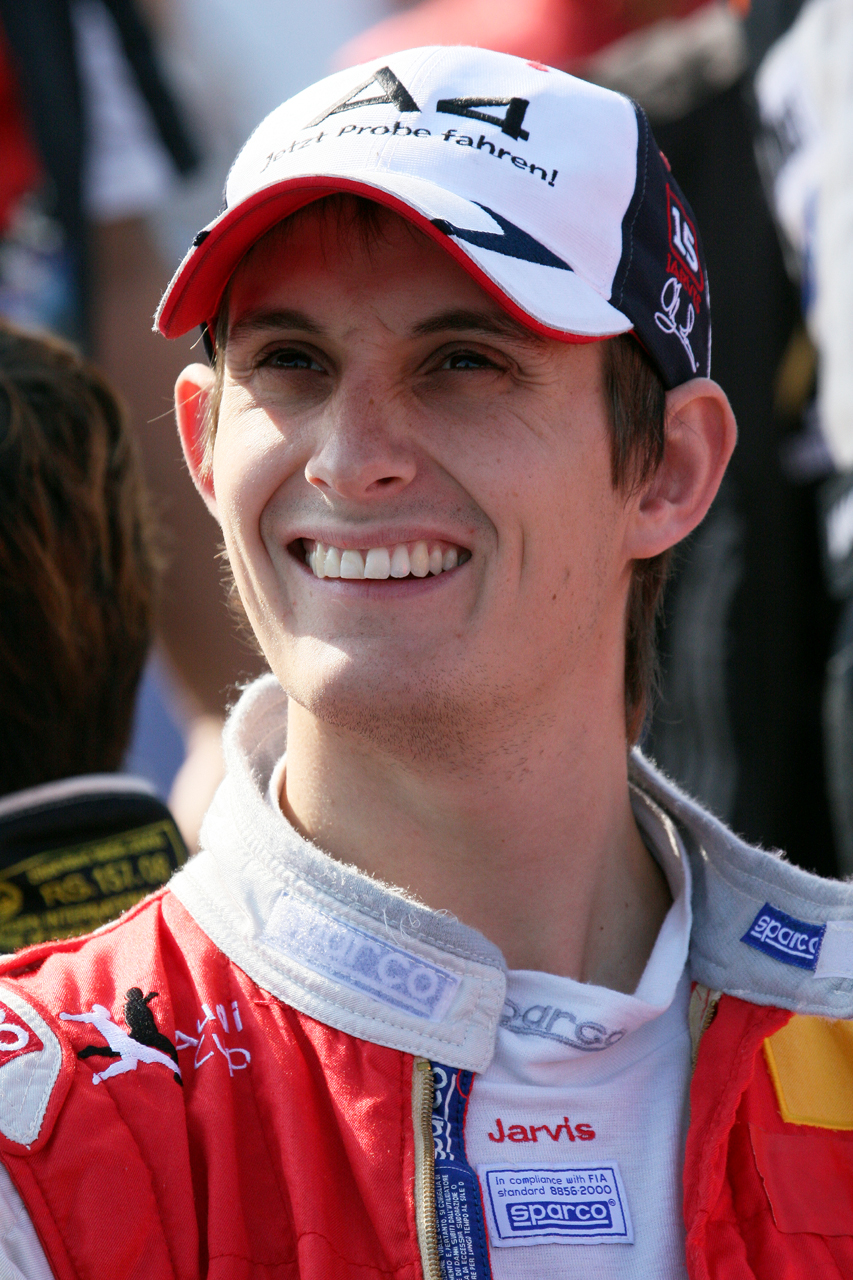
Oliver Jarvis (pictured in 2009) took the place of nine-time 24 Hours of Le Mans winner Tom Kristensen.

A total of 29 cars were officially entered for the 6 Hours of Silverstone with most of the entries in the Le Mans Prototype 1 (LMP1) and Le Mans Prototype 2 (LMP2) classes. The 2014 race winners, Toyota, returned to defend their title. Three manufacturers, Porsche, Toyota and Audi Sport Team Joest, were represented in LMP1 by two cars each. Team ByKolles were the sole LMP1 privateer team partaking in the race. Nissan were scheduled to debut two GT-R LM Nismos at the circuit but decided to forego the first two rounds after issues with the car during testing. The team decided to focus on making its debut at the 24 Hours of Le Mans. Similarly, Rebellion Racing signed a contract to run Advanced Engine Research V6 twin-turbocharged engines instead of Toyota V8s they had used since 2012. This prompted the team to withdraw from the first two races so they and chassis developer Oreca could modify the R-Ones to accommodate the new engine. After the retirement of nine-time 24 Hours of Le Mans winner Tom Kristensen, Audi internally promoted Oliver Jarvis to the squad. ByKolles's Simon Trummer was stranded in Switzerland due to a French air traffic control strike, and Christian Klien, who was signed to drive for Team SARD Morand, was contacted on the day of the first practice session to take his place.

LMP2 consisted of 8 cars with 27 drivers in 4 different types of chassis. Defending LMP2 champions SMP Racing and driver Sergey Zlobin opted not to return, instead focusing on the European Le Mans Series (ELMS) to develop their new BR01 chassis. 2013 class champions OAK Racing returned to the World Endurance Championship (WEC) under their own banner for team owner and driver Jacques Nicolet. Their G-Drive Racing team, which won four races in 2014, expanded to two-cars for 2015. All three entries used the Ligier JS P2-Nissan. KCMG also remained in the WEC for 2015, replacing their Oreca 03R with the newer 05 car. Strakka Racing, who had filed a full-season entry in 2014 but failed to race after development delays with their Strakka-Dome S103 car, returned for 2015 with an unchanged programme.

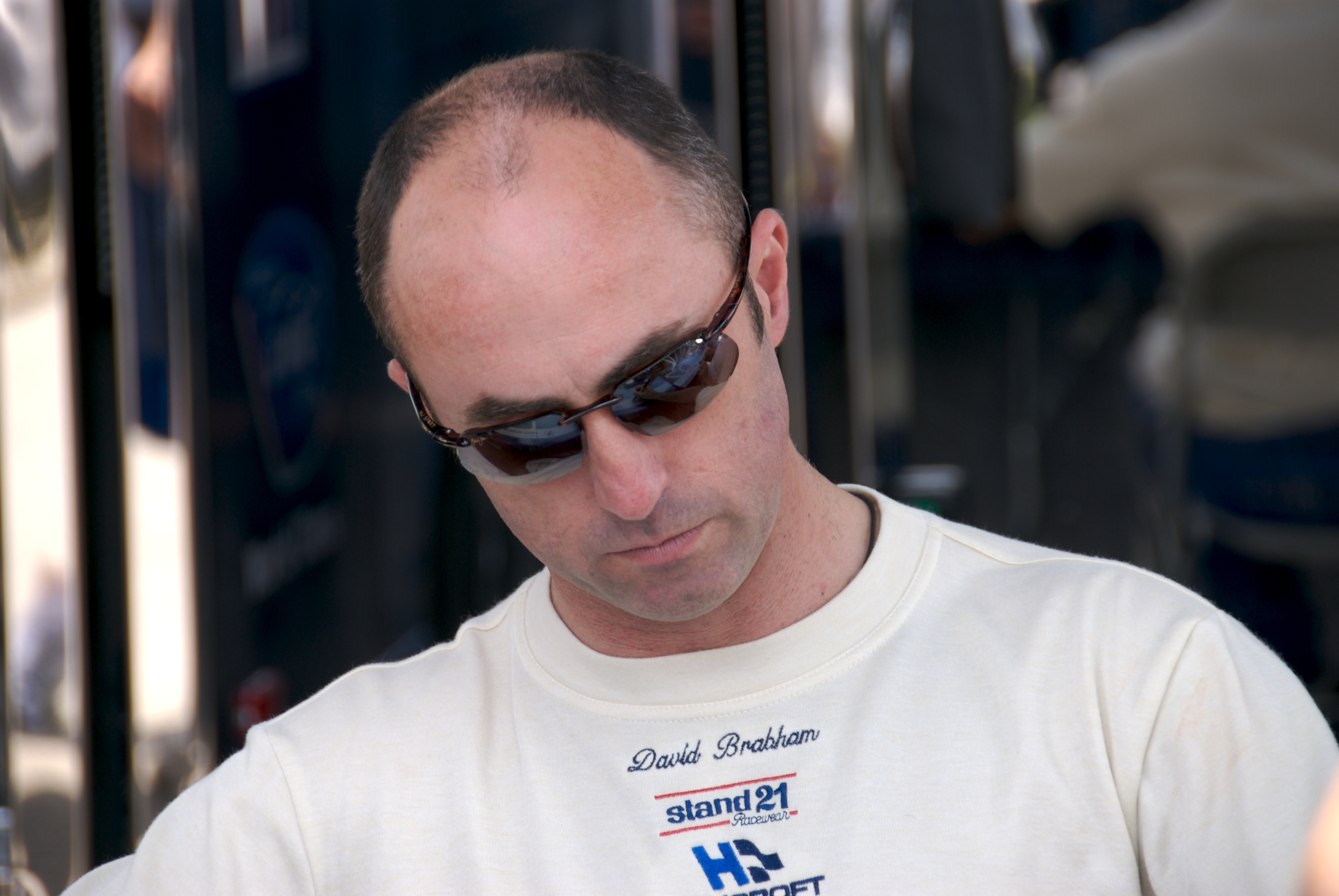
David Brabham (pictured in 2007) replaced Johannes van Overbeek who injured his rib due to a coughing fit.

Defending ELMS champions Signatech, who previously participated in 2012, had backing from Alpine with their Oreca-based A450 chassis with Nissan power. Morand Racing also shifted from the ELMS, partnering with the Japanese firm SARD in a joint effort. The team initially entered two improved Morgan LMP2 cars with Judd engines but problems with a sale to data encryption company Kairos meant the team missed the event. Extreme Speed Motorsports (ESM) was the series' sole North American-representative, moving from the IMSA SportsCar Championship to the WEC, with their two HPD ARX-03bs after a pre-season testing issue forced them to discard the newer 04 chassis. One of their drivers Johannes van Overbeek injured his rib due to a coughing fit the week before and was replaced by 2009 Le Mans co-winner David Brabham.

The Le Mans Grand Touring Endurance Professional (LMGTE Pro) field consisted of three manufacturers (Aston Martin, Ferrari and Porsche), while Le Mans Grand Touring Endurance Amateur (LMGTE Am) included six teams: Aston Martin Racing, AF Corse, Larbre Compétition, Dempsey-Racing Proton, Porsche Team Manthley, and SMP Racing. Three-time LMGTE champions AF Corse's Ferraris had a near identical line-up, and Porsche Team Manthey also kept the drivers for its two cars largely unchanged. Aston Martin Racing expanded their effort to three cars for 2015 after partner Young Driver's entry, which won the LMGTE Am category in 2014, moved to the Pro class. They again fielded two cars in the LMGTE Am class. AF Corse also remained in the category, downgrading from a two-cars to one. Porsche added a second car for Manthey Racing. 2012 LMGTE Am Teams' champions Larbre Compétition returned to the series for the first time in two years, campaigning the first customer Chevrolet Corvette C7.R.

=== Preview ===
A FIA World Motor Sport Council meeting in Doha on 3 December 2014 confirmed the 6 Hours of Silverstone as part of the FIA WEC's 2015 schedule. It was the first of eight endurance sports car races of the 2015 FIA World Endurance Championship, and the fourth running of the event as part of the championship. It was held on 12 April 2015 at the 3.661 mi (5.892 km) 18-turn Silverstone Circuit in Northamptonshire, England, following two days of practice and qualifying. Since the 2013 edition, the overall winners have been presented with the RAC Tourist Trophy.

Audi's head of motorsport Wolfgang Ullrich said the manufacturer was ready for the upcoming season, and noted the closeness of the competition while setting Audi the objective to win at Silverstone for the third time in the WEC: "At the Prologue at Le Castellet, we met with our opponents for the first time in the 2015 season and were able to see everyone is thoroughly prepared – even though nobody put their cards on the table there." Romain Dumas, one of three drivers of the No. 18 Porsche 919 Hybrid, expected more of a battle with his rivals than in 2014. His co-driver Marc Lieb said there was "a score to settle" after retiring early from the 2014 edition. Defending series champions Sébastien Buemi and Anthony Davidson along with their co-driver Kazuki Nakajima revealed their aim of repeating their victory at Silverstone, but Buemi noted the unpredictability of the conditions at the track.

Going into the race, the sport's governing body, the Fédération Internationale de l'Automobile, and the organiser of the series, Automobile Club de l'Ouest, altered the balance of performance in the LMGTE classes for the first time in the season to try to create parity. 10 kg (22 lb) of ballast was added to the LMGTE Pro class Ferrari 458 Italia and the Aston Martin V8 Vantage to reduce their handling abilities. The weight of the Porsche 911 RSR was lowered by 10 kg (22 lb) to increase its performance. The Aston Martin V8 Vantage also received a decrease in performance with the reduction of its air restrictor by 0.3 mm (0.012 in). No changes were made to the Chevrolet Corvette C7.R.

== Practice ==
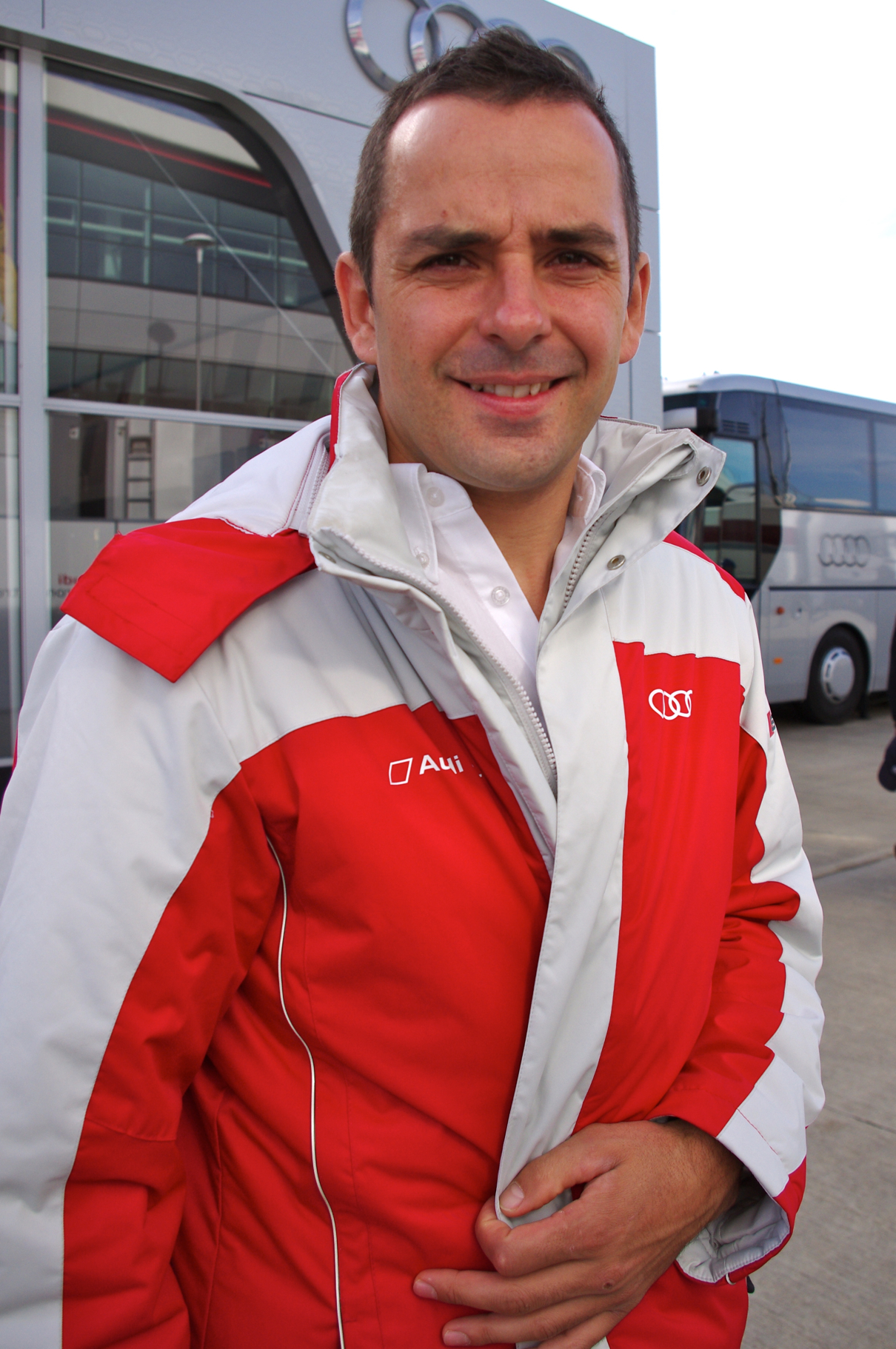
Benoît Tréluyer (pictured in 2013) set the fastest overall lap in all the three practice sessions.

There were three practice sessions—one 90-minute session each on Friday afternoon and early evening and a one-hour session on Saturday morning—preceding Sunday's race. The first session was held in sunny weather and most of the best efforts from the drivers came in its opening minutes. Lucas di Grassi set the fastest lap in the No. 8 Audi at 1:42.291, 0.144 seconds faster than Mark Webber's No. 17 Porsche. André Lotterer in Audi's No. 7 vehicle was third, and Neel Jani was fourth in the sister Porsche. The fastest Toyota was fifth after a lap from Alexander Wurz. Gustavo Yacamán led LMP2 in G-Drive Racing's No. 28 Ligier JS P2-Nissan car with a lap of 1:50.213, 0.053 seconds quicker than teammate Sam Bird. The No. 95 Aston Martin V8 Vantage driven by Nicki Thiim was quickest early on in LMGTE Pro. Klaus Bachler in the No. 88 Abu Dhabi-Proton Racing Porsche 911 RSR led in LMGTE Am.

Jarvis in the Audi No. 8 car led the second session early on before the No. 7 entry driven by Benoît Tréluyer's was fastest with the day's best time of 1:41.526. Jarvis's lap was 0.298 seconds slower putting the No. 8 car second overall. Brendon Hartley was the best of the Porsches in third and his teammate Dumas was fourth. The two Toyotas of Stéphane Sarrazin and Nakajima were fifth and sixth. The pair of G-Drive Racing Ligiers were again fastest in LMP2 with Pipo Derani going quickest of the day with a 1:48.676 lap, and Bird six-tenths of a second slower. The two Porsche Team Manthey cars of Richard Lietz (No. 91) and Frédéric Makowiecki (No. 92) led LMGTE Pro. Pedro Lamy's No. 98 Aston Martin recorded the fastest lap in LMGTE Am.

The third (and final) practice session was held in damp weather. Buemi and Wurz's Toyotas were the early pace setters until Marcel Fässler's No. 7 Audi went faster as some cars went off the slippery track and into Copse corner's gravel trap. A dry line began to appear after 25 minutes. The fastest laps fell by five seconds as Lotterer improved on co-driver Fässler's time. Nelson Panciatici necessitated the showing of localised full course yellow flags when he spun and beached the No. 36 Signatech Alpine in the gravel trap at Stowe corner with 12 minutes to go. After practice restarted, Lotterer set the fastest overall lap at 1:52.094 in the final minutes. Nakajima was the fastest of the two Toyotas in second, and Porsches teammates Lieb and Timo Bernhard were third and fourth. Derani set a late lap of 2:05.786 to go fastest in LMP2, followed by Matthew Howson's No. 47 KCMG Oreca 05. Makowiecki put the No. 92 Porsche atop of LMGTE Pro, as the fastest LMGTE Am lap came from Emmanuel Collard's AF Corse No. 83 Ferrari 458 Italia.

== Qualifying ==
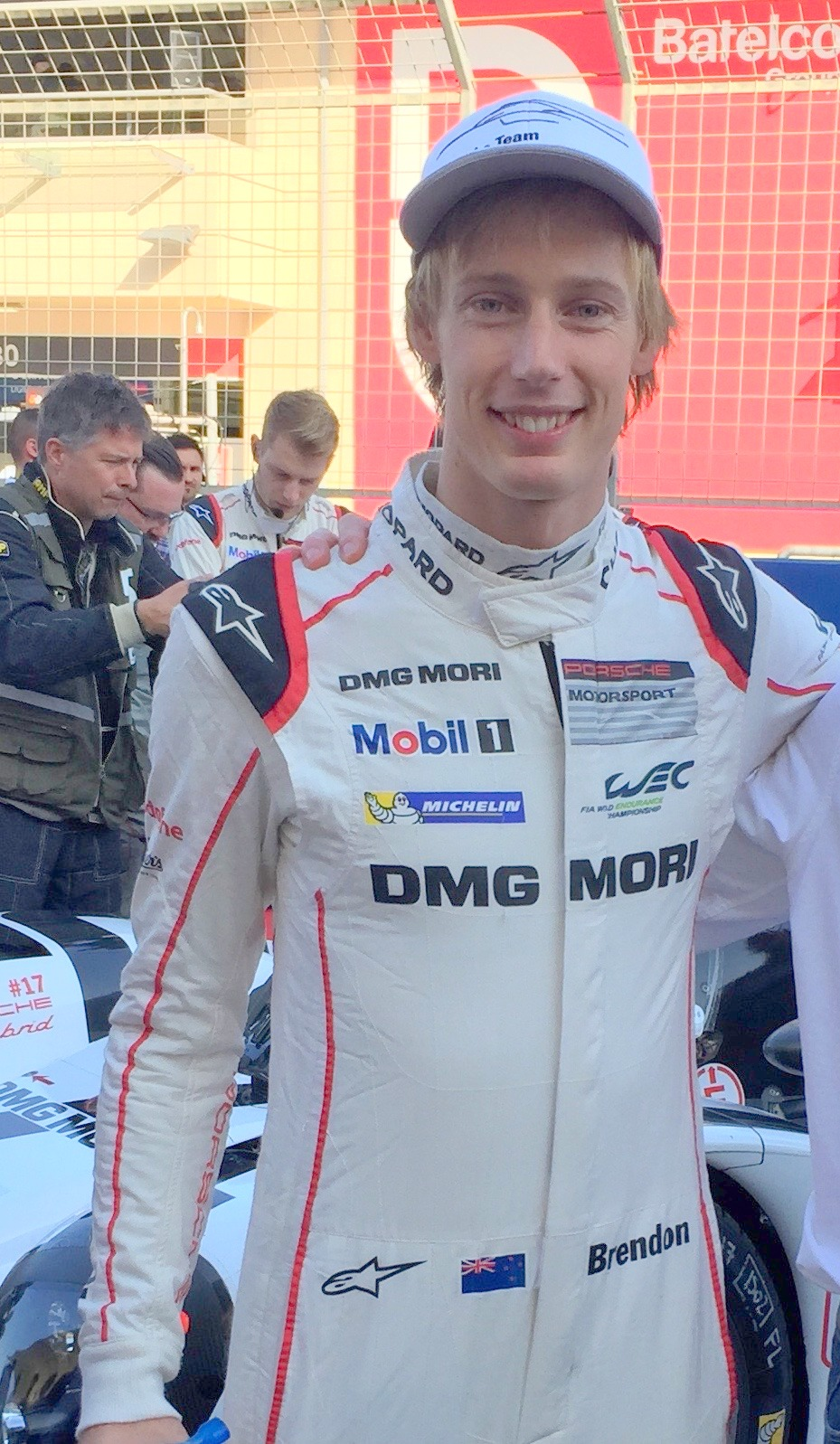
Brendon Hartley helped put the No. 17 Porsche 919 Hybrid on pole position in qualifying.

Saturday's afternoon qualifying session was divided into two 20 minute groups. Cars in LMGTE Pro and AM were sent out first before LMP1 and LMP2 entries. All cars were required to have two drivers set one timed lap each and their fastest average lap times set the starting order. The fastest team and drivers earned one point towards their respective championships. Webber in the No. 17 Porsche set a benchmark 1:39.908 lap. His co-driver Hartley went faster in clear air, with a 1:39.634 time. The team claimed pole position with a two-lap average of 1:39.721. They were joined on the grid's front row by their teammates Jani and Dumas who were 0.619 seconds slower. Dumas attributed the No. 18 car's slower pace to him making an error on his first lap and being delayed by slower traffic on his next try. Di Grassi and Jarvis put the No. 8 Audi 0.012 seconds behind the slower Porsche in third. The fastest Toyota was the No. 1 car of Davidson and Nakajima in fourth after Nakajima lost time in slower traffic in the final third of the lap. Lotterer and Fässler's No. 7 Audi took fifth and Sarrazin and Mike Conway's No. 2 Toyota qualified sixth. The LMP1 manufacturer field was close together as the first six were separated by almost two seconds. The crew of the No. 4 ByKolles Racing car were more than ten seconds slower than the manufacturer field and completed the LMP1 field.

In LMP2, G-Drive Racing swept the front row of the class grid as Derani and Ricardo González in the No. 28 car took pole position by going faster than Roman Rusinov's and Olivier Pla 2014 pole lap with a two-lap average lap of 1:48.021, 0.062 seconds ahead of the sister No. 26 car of Rusinov and Bird. Howson and Nick Tandy in the No. 47 KCMG car was 1.3 seconds slower in third. Signatech Alpine's No. 36 vehicle came fourth in the hands of Paul-Loup Chatin and Vincent Capillaire. The No. 30 ESM car of Ryan Dalziel and David Heinemeier Hansson in fifth were 3.5 seconds slower than the new generation of class vehicles. Thiim and Marco Sørensen, competing in the No. 97 Aston Martin, were the fastest LMGTE Pro qualifiers. They had the only two-lap average time under 2 minutes, at 1:59.970, although Sørensen made some minor errors on his lap. Richie Stanaway and Fernando Rees in the No. 99 car were 0.206 seconds slower in second, while Darren Turner and Stefan Mücke's No. 95 car gave Aston Martin the first three positions in category. Lietz and Michael Christensen sharing the No. 91 Porsche took fourth and the No. 51 AF Corse Ferrari of Gianmaria Bruni and Toni Vilander qualified fifth. In LMGTE Am, Lamy and Paul Dalla Lana completed a sweep of GTE pole positions for Aston Martin with a two-lap class average of 2:01.998, 0.937 seconds faster than Larbre Compétition's No. 50 Corvette of Paolo Ruberti and Kristian Poulsen in second. The No. 88 Abu Dhabi Racing Proton Porsche driven by Khaled al Qubaisi and Bachler qualified third in class. The duo held second until the No. 50 Larbre Compétition Corvette went faster.

=== Qualifying results ===
Pole position winners in each class are marked in bold.

Final qualifying classification
Pos	Class	Team	Average Time	Gap	Grid
1	**LMP1**	**No. 17 Porsche Team**	**1:39.721**	—	**1**
2	LMP1	No. 18 Porsche Team	1:40.340	+0.619	2
3	LMP1	No. 8 Audi Sport Team Joest	1:40.352	+0.631	3
4	LMP1	No. 1 Toyota Racing	1:40.382	+0.661	4
5	LMP1	No. 7 Audi Sport Team Joest	1:41.153	+1.432	5
6	LMP1	No. 2 Toyota Racing	1:41.694	+1.973	6
7	**LMP2**	**No. 28 G-Drive Racing**	**1:48.021**	**+8.300**	**7**
8	LMP2	No. 26 G-Drive Racing	1:48.083	+8.362	8
9	LMP2	No. 47 KCMG	1:49.389	+9.668	9
10	LMP2	No. 36 Signatech Alpine	1:49.498	+9.777	10
11	LMP1	No. 4 Team ByKolles	1:50.622	+10.901	11
12	LMP2	No. 30 Extreme Speed Motorsports	1:51.551	+11.830	12
13	LMP2	No. 42 Strakka Racing	1:52.284	+12.563	13
14	LMP2	No. 35 OAK Racing	1:53.457	+13.736	14
15	LMP2	No. 31 Extreme Speed Motorsports	1:55.491	+15.770	15
16	**LMGTE Pro**	**No. 95 Aston Martin Racing**	**1:59.970**	**+20.249**	**16**
17	LMGTE Pro	No. 99 Aston Martin Racing V8	2:00.175	+20.454	17
18	LMGTE Pro	No. 97 Aston Martin Racing	2:00.333	+20.612	18
19	LMGTE Pro	No. 91 Porsche Team Manthey	2:00.651	+20.930	19
20	LMGTE Pro	No. 51 AF Corse	2:00.701	+20.980	20
21	LMGTE Pro	No. 92 Porsche Team Manthey	2:01.591	+21.870	21
22	**LMGTE Am**	**No. 98 Aston Martin Racing**	**2:01.998**	**+22.277**	**22**
23	LMGTE Pro	No. 71 AF Corse	2:02.156	+22.435	23
24	LMGTE Am	No. 50 Larbre Compétition	2:02.937	+23.216	24
25	LMGTE Am	No. 88 Abu Dhabi-Proton Racing	2:03.134	+23.413	25
26	LMGTE Am	No. 83 AF Corse	2:03.482	+23.761	26
27	LMGTE Am	No. 72 SMP Racing	2:04.114	+24.393	27
28	LMGTE Am	No. 96 Aston Martin Racing	2:05.050	+25.329	28
29	LMGTE Am	No. 77 Dempsey Racing-Proton	2:06.024	+26.303	29

== Race ==
The weather at the start were dry and sunny with the air temperature between 12.7 and 15.3 °C (54.9 and 59.5 °F); the track temperature ranged from 10.5 to 15.5 °C (50.9 to 59.9 °F). When the race began before a crowd of 45,000 spectators at 12:00 British Summer Time (UTC+01:00), Webber retained the lead into the first corner as his teammate Dumas came under attack from di Grassi into Aintree turn. Elsewhere, Tandy made a fast getaway in the KCMG Oreca to claim the lead of LMP2 from the pair of G-Drive Ligiers. On lap three, Di Grassi again tried to overtake Dumas but put himself on the outside of Loop corner, forcing him to slow and give Buemi an opportunity to pass him for third. The No. 4 ByKolles Racing CLM P1/01 of Vitantonio Liuzzi sustained damage to its floor after reported contact by Dalziel's No. 30 ESM, necessitating half an hour of repairs to the car in the garage. After going wide, Wurz lost fifth to Tréluyer as Bird retook the LMP2 lead from Tandy at Brooklands corner on the sixth lap. The overall leaders encountered slower traffic 12 minutes in; di Grassi was caught out by this and fell to fifth behind Tréluyer and Wurz by running wide.

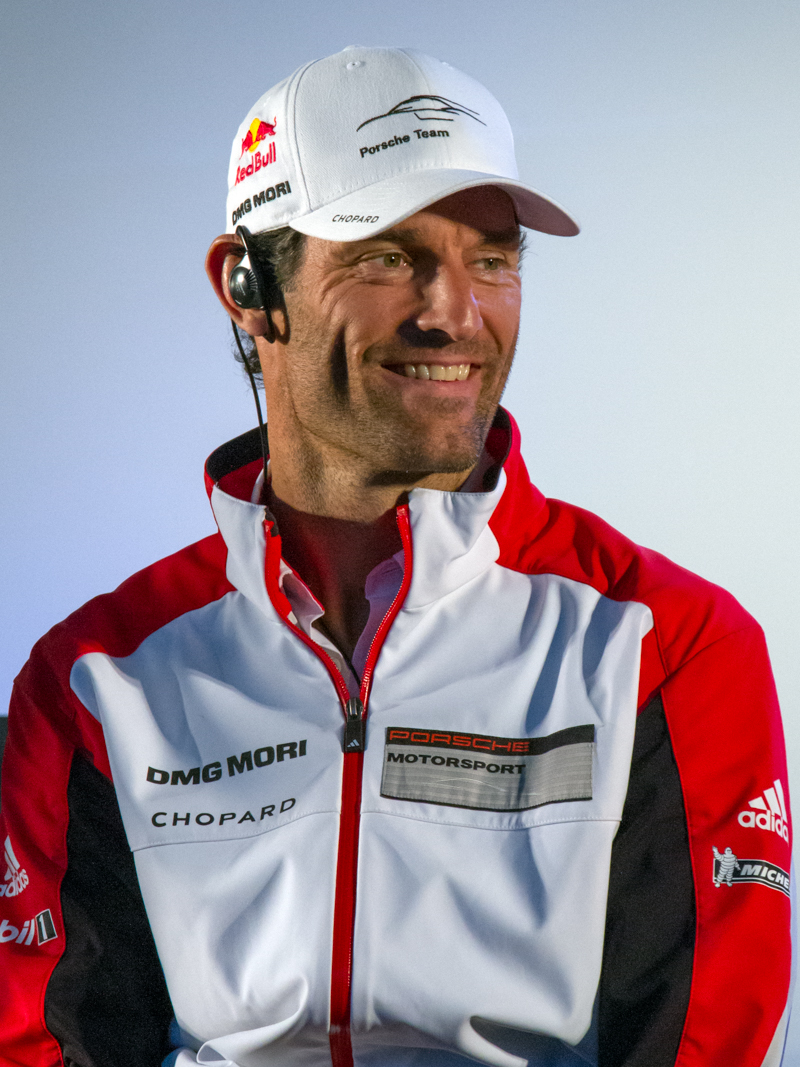
Mark Webber (pictured in 2014) led from pole position until the No. 17 Porsche's rear drivetrain forced him out of the race.

Derani passed Tandy on the run to Village corner for second in LMP2. Tréluyer put Buemi under pressure for third overall, and di Grassi retook fifth from Wurz. Later, Bachler took over the lead of LMGTE Am, and Tréluyer lost fourth to his teammate di Grassi leaving Copse corner. Overtakes occurred in LMGTE Pro as Porsche teammates Lietz and Patrick Pilet got by Stanaway, and Bruni moved past the latter at Stowe corner. Forty-one minutes in, the first full course yellow was necessitated by Chatin's No. 36 Signatech Alpine car's incorrectly fitted left-rear wheel coming loose into Corse turn. The vehicle's left-rear struck the outside tyre barrier. Chatin was unhurt and boarded an ambulance without aid. Several drivers made their first pit stops for fuel and tyres under the full course yellow while others remained on the circuit. Racing resumed five minutes later with Webber leading teammate Dumas. Race control noticed no repairs to the wall at Copse corner had been done. The second full course yellow was activated early in the second hour to allow this to happen. This caused the trio of LMGTE Pro Aston Martins to lose time making their pit stops between the green flag and the full course yellow.

Immediately after the restart, Buemi could not use his hybrid boost system because there was no charge in the capacitor. Buemi was caught off guard as Tréluyer overtook him on the outside at Becketts turn and then by di Grassi at Vale corner to fall to fifth overall. Davide Rigon in the No. 71 AF Corse Ferrari took the LMGTE Pro lead because they were on an alternative strategy. Tandy lost third in LMP2 to Dalziel after a slow in-lap. An hour and 20 minutes in (lap 44) Webber drove the No. 17 Porsche into the pit lane to retire the car with a rear drivetrain issue. This gave Lieb the outright lead as he relieved Dumas in the No. 18 Porsche and the Audis of di Grassi and Tréluyer gained second and third. The Audis duelled over second in slower traffic when Tréluyer passed di Grassi on the inside into Abbey corner. Their fast pace, however, put them onto the run-off area, but they rejoined into Farm curve without losing a plethora of time. Di Grassi was lapping Christian Ried's No. 88 Abu Dhabi Proton Racing Porsche when the two connected at Becketts corner. Di Grassi returned to the pit lane and repairs to the No. 8 vehicle's rear-left deck took two minutes. The car rejoined a lap down in sixth with Loïc Duval aboard.

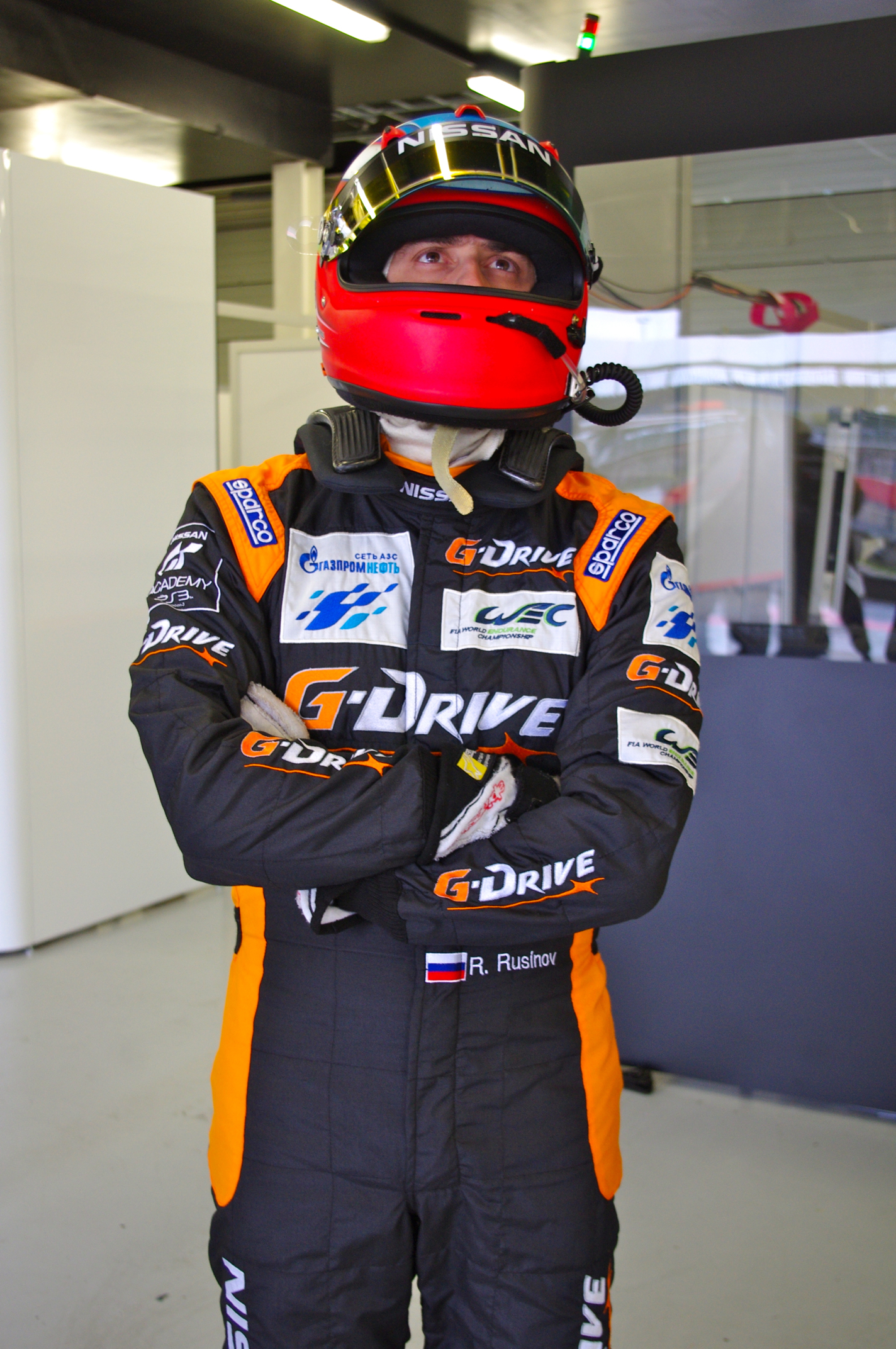
Roman Rusinov (pictured in 2013) contributed to the No. 26 G-Drive Racing Ligier's win by a lap from the sister No. 28 car.

As the second round of pit stops for fuel and driver changes began, Tréluyer drew closer to Lieb, who was momentarily delayed by Danny Watts' No. 42 Strakka Racing Dome, and Tréluyer moved into the lead on the outside into Becketts turn before Lieb retook it due to his car's higher straight-line speed on the Wellington Straight into Stowe corner. The two made their pit stops soon after as Fässler took over the No. 7 Audi and Jani entered the No. 18 Porsche. Wurz gained the overall lead after an earlier pit stop during the full course yellow allowed him to lead by 40 seconds. Later, Tandy's No. 47 KCMG car went into the garage after a stone punctured a hole in its radiator and created water pressure issues. Jani lost second to Fässler on the inside into Village corner; Jani responded by reclaiming the position on the Wellington Straight. The two repeated the same manoeuvres over the following three laps until Fässler slowed slightly. In the meantime, Makowiecki's No. 92 Porsche gained the LMGTE Pro lead when Rigon made the No. 71 AF Corse Ferrari's second pit stop and James Calado relieved him.

Davidson was closing by one second per lap on the duelling Jani and Fässler. Duval got the No. 8 Audi back onto the lead lap when he and Jani negotiated their way past a LMGTE Am Ferrari. During the third phase of pit stops, Conway's No. 2 Toyota was lapping Gianluca Roda's No. 50 Larbre Compétition Corvette at Becketts corner when he was unseen by Roda. Conway mounted the kerb in avoidance, hitting a thin plastic bollard that lodged itself in the front of the Toyota's splitter affecting its turn-in handing. Conway's teammate Davidson overtook him for second soon after and took the lead when Jani's No. 18 Porsche entered the pit lane for fuel and tyres; Dumas relieved him. Dumas emerged just ahead of the No. 7 Audi which now had Lotterer aboard. Dumas forced Lieb wide onto the outside line at Village corner for third and kept the position on the Hangar Straight. Lotterer's newer tyres allowed him to close on Conway, and he passed him on the inside at Vale corner for second. Conway later ran wide at Abbey turn because of his worn tyres and lost fourth to Dumas.

Rusinov had an anxious moment in the No. 26 G-Drive Ligier when the No. 97 Aston Martin blocked him under braking for the end of the Wellington Straight and spun at Brooklands turn. He recovered without losing the LMP2 class lead to teammate González as he held a one-minute lead. Lotterer was quicker than race leader Davidson through slower traffic and attempted to pass him on the inside at Brooklands corner, but Davidson blocked him on the Wellington Straight. The following lap, Lotterer tried again into Village turn and was successful this time round and subsequently pulled away. Bruni's No. 51 AF Corse Ferrari took the lead of LMGTE Pro in the fifth minute of the third hour after Pilet's No. 92 Porsche picked up a right-front puncture from going off the circuit. The car entered the garage for four minutes and fell to sixth in class with Makowiecki aboard. Dumas returned to the overall lead during the next pit stop cycle before Lotterer retook it by double stinting his tyres and only stopping for fuel. Lieb now drove the No. 18 Porsche when he went off the racing line onto some astroturf leaving Stowe corner but regained control of the car without losing too much time. Three minutes later, Conway passed Lieb on the inside at Vale corner for third.

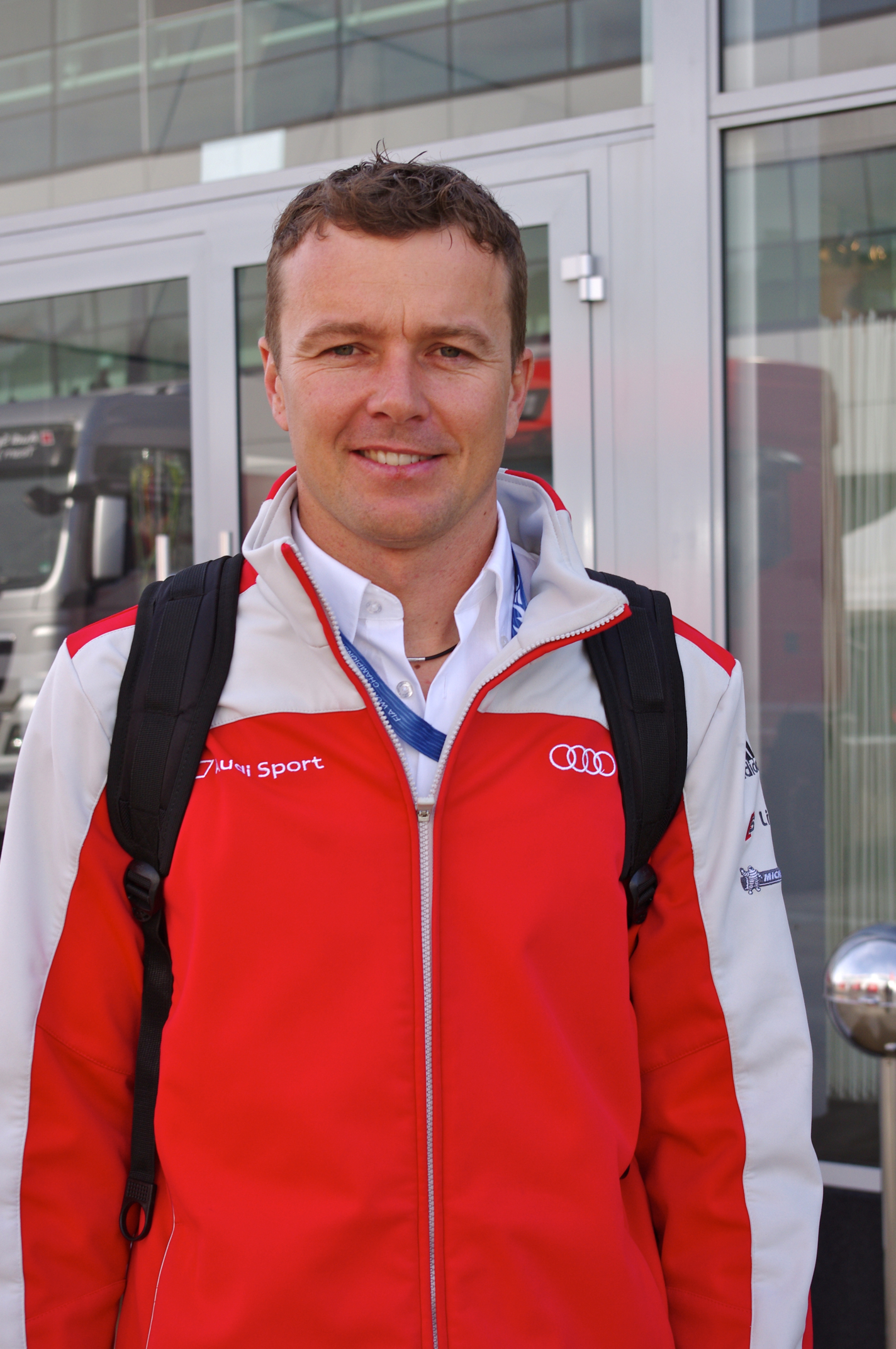
Marcel Fässler (pictured in 2015) helped achieve the No. 7 Audi's ninth overall win.

Duval's No. 8 Audi was forced into the pit lane after running onto grass, spending 6 1/2 minutes and four laps to clean debris at the front of the car. Rigon caught his teammate Vilander and tried unsuccessfully to pass him on the outside at Village corner for the LMGTE Pro lead. A few minutes later, Rigon tried again, passed Vilander and pulled away. Jarvis in the No. 8 Audi saw some space to pass Poulsen's No. 50 Larbre Compétition Corvette at Becketts turn, but Poulsen turned to block Jarvis and the two collided. Poulsen continued after marshal assistance to extricate him from the gravel trap. Meanwhile, Jani relieved Dumas, and Fässler took over from Lotterer at their pit stops. The two LMGTE Pro AF Corse Ferraris started again to duel for the class lead. Bruni tried to overtake Calado at Brooklands corner but was unable to pass because Calado blocked him. On the next lap, Bruni tried again and was successful in passing Calado at the same corner.

In the final hour, Jani moved the No. 18 Porsche into second and closed on Fässler's No. 7 Audi. Jani moved past Fässler on the Wellington Straight due to the Porsche's straightline speed advantage, but the latter came back to reclaim the lead. It momentarily returned to Jani until it was retaken by Fässler entering Copse corner as the Porsche struggled to stay with Audi in the turns. Jani re-took the lead and kept it for two minutes before making his last pit stop for left-hand side tyres and no fuel. The final retiree came with 40 minutes to go when Klien went off at Village corner and damaged the radiator and had stiff handling because of aerodynamic deficiencies. Buemi made the No. 1 Toyota's final pit stop for fuel from second overall and came out behind Jani who opened up a four-second gap over the car. Drama came with 18 minutes left when race control deemed Fässler to have transgressed track limits while passing slower cars on the outside tarmac run-off area at the exit of Club corner, imposing a 10-second stop-and-go penalty that he took with 15 minutes to go and then took fuel.

Fässler kept the lead after his race engineer Leena Gade encouraged him to push hard. In the meantime Jani lowered the gap to 12 seconds, and steadily reduced it over the next 14 minutes by pushing hard with his lap times in the 1:42 range. However, Fässler maintained the overall lead and crossed the start/finish line in a new race distance record of 201 laps to win by 4.610 seconds for his, Lotterer and Tréluyer's ninth outright career victory. Buemi got the No. 1 Toyota onto the final step of the overall podium in third. Bird maintained No. 26 G-Drive Oreca's lead to win in LMP2 by one lap over the sister No. 28 car, which had a handling problem traced to the steering. The third-placed No. 30 ESM car failed its post-race technical inspection. Its front and rear underfloor skid planks were deemed to be under the minimum thickness of 20 mm (2.0 cm), and the No. 42 Strakka Racing entry was given third in LMP2. The No. 51 AF Corse Ferrari of Rigon and Vilander was unchallenged in the final hour of the race and won in LMGTE Pro. The No. 91 Porsche of Christensen and Lietz took second; Bruni and Calado's No. 71 AF Corse car took third on a six-stop strategy in which the team decided to switch only the left-hand tyres for the final stop. In LMGTE Am, Dalla Lana, Mathias Lauda and Lamy took their third successive win at Silverstone in the No. 98 Aston Martin and were 13.712 seconds ahead of Rui Águas, Emmanuel Collard and François Perrodo's No. 83 AF Corse Ferrari.

=== Post-race ===
The top three finishers of all four classes appeared on the podium to collect their trophies and at a later press conference. Lotterer acknowledged Audi were under pressure to perform from the first lap and spoke of their desire to carry momentum into Spa-Francorchamps. Fässler was sad to incur a stop-and-go penalty and said he felt it would have been fairer had the team been given time to think about the situation. Nevertheless, he was pleased with the duel he had with Jani. Tréluyer also expressed his frustration over the penalty as he discussed the situation with his co-drivers. He noted several cars had gone off the circuit throughout the race, but said he was happy with the victory, which he called "a well-deserved reward for all the effort the team have put in over the winter." Jani said he enjoyed driving in the race and was trusting of Fässler to battle him without contact, "For sure it was a great sportscar race and all three manufacturers are all very close. We have to push because it is a six-hour sprint race." Davidson said he felt Toyota had to double stint their tyres to stay in contention for the victory but hoped to get into a position where they had an advantage on circuits with higher levels of tyre wear than Silverstone.

Journalists reviewing the race agreed that the battle between Fässler's No. 7 Audi and Jani's No. 18 Porsche for the win was its highlight. Jack Philipps of Motor Sport wrote that it was like "Mini Cooper against Ford Falcon", and called it, "Utterly scintillating and, when the second Audi joined the battle to unlap itself, even more spectacular". The Guardian's Giles Richards commented that the momentum Audi were anxious to maintain would be tested at Spa and the 24 Hours of Le Mans since the gap between the three manufacturers was marginal. "Audi have once again made their point that you underestimate them at your peril, but the team who use the hashtag #welcomechallenges have found their offer accepted with a powerful and determined threat this year and one that bodes well for a cracking season." Writing for NBC Sports, Luke Smith said, "At the start of what looks poised to be the WEC's biggest season to date, Silverstone played host to an incredible feast of racing on Sunday as the LMP1 titans all laid claim to their title bid." David Hobbs of AOL considered Lotterer to be Audi's best driver at Silverstone as he was instrumental in helping the team take what the journalist called "a famous victory".

As this was the first race of the season, Lotterer, Fässler and Tréluyer took the lead of the Drivers' Championship with 25 points, seven points ahead of Lieb, Jani and Dumas in second. The trio were a further three points ahead of Buemi, Davidson and Nakajima in third. Their teammates Wurz, Sarrazin and Conway were fourth with 12 points, with Duval, di Grassi and Jarvis fifth with 10 points. Audi took the early lead in the Manufacturers' Championship with 35 points, seven points ahead of Toyota in second; the third-placed manufacturer Porsche had scored 19 points with seven rounds left in the season.

=== Race results ===
The minimum number of laps for classification (70 per cent of the overall winning car's race distance) was 141 laps. Class winners are denoted in bold.

Final race classification
Pos	Class	No	Team	Drivers	Chassis	Tyre	Laps	Time/Retired
Pos	Class	No	Team	Drivers	Engine	Tyre	Laps	Time/Retired
1	**LMP1**	**7**	**(Germany) Audi Sport Team Joest**	**(Germany) André Lotterer (Switzerland) Marcel Fässler (France) Benoît Tréluyer**	**Audi R18 e-tron quattro**	M	**201**	**6:00:30.876**
1	**LMP1**	**7**	**(Germany) Audi Sport Team Joest**	**(Germany) André Lotterer (Switzerland) Marcel Fässler (France) Benoît Tréluyer**	**Audi TDI 4.0 L Turbo Diesel V6**	M	**201**	**6:00:30.876**
2	LMP1	18	(Germany) Porsche Team	(Germany) Marc Lieb (France) Romain Dumas (Switzerland) Neel Jani	Porsche 919 Hybrid	M	201	+4.610
2	LMP1	18	(Germany) Porsche Team	(Germany) Marc Lieb (France) Romain Dumas (Switzerland) Neel Jani	Porsche 2.0 L Turbo V4	M	201	+4.610
3	LMP1	1	(Japan) Toyota Racing	(United Kingdom) Anthony Davidson (Switzerland) Sébastien Buemi (Japan) Kazuki Nakajima	Toyota TS040 Hybrid	M	201	+10.206
3	LMP1	1	(Japan) Toyota Racing	(United Kingdom) Anthony Davidson (Switzerland) Sébastien Buemi (Japan) Kazuki Nakajima	Toyota 3.7 L V8	M	201	+10.206
4	LMP1	2	(Japan) Toyota Racing	(Austria) Alexander Wurz (France) Stéphane Sarrazin (United Kingdom) Mike Conway	Toyota TS040 Hybrid	M	200	+1 Lap
4	LMP1	2	(Japan) Toyota Racing	(Austria) Alexander Wurz (France) Stéphane Sarrazin (United Kingdom) Mike Conway	Toyota 3.7 L V8	M	200	+1 Lap
5	LMP1	8	(Germany) Audi Sport Team Joest	(France) Loïc Duval (Brazil) Lucas di Grassi (United Kingdom) Oliver Jarvis	Audi R18 e-tron quattro	M	197	+4 Laps
5	LMP1	8	(Germany) Audi Sport Team Joest	(France) Loïc Duval (Brazil) Lucas di Grassi (United Kingdom) Oliver Jarvis	Audi TDI 4.0 L Turbo Diesel V6	M	197	+4 Laps
6	**LMP2**	**26**	**(Russia) G-Drive Racing**	**(Russia) Roman Rusinov (France) Julien Canal (United Kingdom) Sam Bird**	**Ligier JS P2**	D	**185**	**+16 Laps**
6	**LMP2**	**26**	**(Russia) G-Drive Racing**	**(Russia) Roman Rusinov (France) Julien Canal (United Kingdom) Sam Bird**	**Nissan VK45DE 4.5 L V8**	D	**185**	**+16 Laps**
7	LMP2	28	(Russia) G-Drive Racing	(Colombia) Gustavo Yacamán (Mexico) Ricardo González (Brazil) Pipo Derani	Ligier JS P2	D	184	+17 Laps
7	LMP2	28	(Russia) G-Drive Racing	(Colombia) Gustavo Yacamán (Mexico) Ricardo González (Brazil) Pipo Derani	Nissan VK45DE 4.5 L V8	D	184	+17 Laps
8	LMP2	42	(United Kingdom) Strakka Racing	(United Kingdom) Nick Leventis (United Kingdom) Jonny Kane (United Kingdom) Danny Watts	Strakka Dome S103	M	178	+23 Laps
8	LMP2	42	(United Kingdom) Strakka Racing	(United Kingdom) Nick Leventis (United Kingdom) Jonny Kane (United Kingdom) Danny Watts	Nissan VK45DE 4.5 L V8	M	178	+23 Laps
9	**LMGTE; Pro**	**51**	**(Italy) AF Corse**	**(Italy) Gianmaria Bruni (Finland) Toni Vilander**	**Ferrari 458 Italia GT2**	M	**172**	**+29 Laps**
9	**LMGTE; Pro**	**51**	**(Italy) AF Corse**	**(Italy) Gianmaria Bruni (Finland) Toni Vilander**	**Ferrari 4.5 L V8**	M	**172**	**+29 Laps**
10	LMGTE; Pro	91	(Germany) Porsche Team Manthey	(Austria) Richard Lietz (Denmark) Michael Christensen	Porsche 911 RSR	M	172	+29 Laps
10	LMGTE; Pro	91	(Germany) Porsche Team Manthey	(Austria) Richard Lietz (Denmark) Michael Christensen	Porsche 4.0 L Flat-6	M	172	+29 Laps
11	LMGTE; Pro	71	(Italy) AF Corse	(Italy) Davide Rigon (United Kingdom) James Calado	Ferrari 458 Italia GT2	M	172	+29 Laps
11	LMGTE; Pro	71	(Italy) AF Corse	(Italy) Davide Rigon (United Kingdom) James Calado	Ferrari 4.5 L V8	M	172	+29 Laps
12	LMGTE; Pro	95	(United Kingdom) Aston Martin Racing	(Denmark) Christoffer Nygaard (Denmark) Nicki Thiim (Denmark) Marco Sørensen	Aston Martin V8 Vantage GTE	M	171	+30 Laps
12	LMGTE; Pro	95	(United Kingdom) Aston Martin Racing	(Denmark) Christoffer Nygaard (Denmark) Nicki Thiim (Denmark) Marco Sørensen	Aston Martin 4.5 L V8	M	171	+30 Laps
13	LMGTE; Pro	97	(United Kingdom) Aston Martin Racing	(United Kingdom) Darren Turner (Germany) Stefan Mücke	Aston Martin V8 Vantage GTE	M	171	+30 Laps
13	LMGTE; Pro	97	(United Kingdom) Aston Martin Racing	(United Kingdom) Darren Turner (Germany) Stefan Mücke	Aston Martin 4.5 L V8	M	171	+30 Laps
14	LMGTE; Pro	99	(United Kingdom) Aston Martin Racing V8	(Brazil) Fernando Rees (United Kingdom) Alex MacDowall (New Zealand) Richie Stanaway	Aston Martin V8 Vantage GTE	M	171	+30 Laps
14	LMGTE; Pro	99	(United Kingdom) Aston Martin Racing V8	(Brazil) Fernando Rees (United Kingdom) Alex MacDowall (New Zealand) Richie Stanaway	Aston Martin 4.5 L V8	M	171	+30 Laps
15	LMGTE; Pro	92	(Germany) Porsche Team Manthey	(France) Patrick Pilet (France) Frédéric Makowiecki	Porsche 911 RSR	M	170	+31 Laps
15	LMGTE; Pro	92	(Germany) Porsche Team Manthey	(France) Patrick Pilet (France) Frédéric Makowiecki	Porsche 4.0 L Flat-6	M	170	+31 Laps
16	**LMGTE; Am**	**98**	**(United Kingdom) Aston Martin Racing**	**(Canada) Paul Dalla Lana (Portugal) Pedro Lamy (Austria) Mathias Lauda**	**Aston Martin V8 Vantage GTE**	M	**168**	**+33 Laps**
16	**LMGTE; Am**	**98**	**(United Kingdom) Aston Martin Racing**	**(Canada) Paul Dalla Lana (Portugal) Pedro Lamy (Austria) Mathias Lauda**	**Aston Martin 4.5 L V8**	M	**168**	**+33 Laps**
17	LMGTE; Am	83	(Italy) AF Corse	(France) François Perrodo (France) Emmanuel Collard (Portugal) Rui Águas	Ferrari 458 Italia GT2	M	168	+33 Laps
17	LMGTE; Am	83	(Italy) AF Corse	(France) François Perrodo (France) Emmanuel Collard (Portugal) Rui Águas	Ferrari 4.5 L V8	M	168	+33 Laps
18	LMGTE; Am	72	(Russia) SMP Racing	(Russia) Viktor Shaitar (Russia) Aleksey Basov (Italy) Andrea Bertolini	Ferrari 458 Italia GT2	M	168	+33 Laps
18	LMGTE; Am	72	(Russia) SMP Racing	(Russia) Viktor Shaitar (Russia) Aleksey Basov (Italy) Andrea Bertolini	Ferrari 4.5 L V8	M	168	+33 Laps
19	LMP2	47	(Hong Kong) KCMG	(United Kingdom) Matthew Howson (United Kingdom) Richard Bradley (United Kingdom) Nick Tandy	Oreca 05	D	167	+34 Laps
19	LMP2	47	(Hong Kong) KCMG	(United Kingdom) Matthew Howson (United Kingdom) Richard Bradley (United Kingdom) Nick Tandy	Nissan VK45DE 4.5 L V8	D	167	+34 Laps
20	LMGTE; Am	96	(United Kingdom) Aston Martin Racing	(Germany) Roald Goethe (United Kingdom) Stuart Hall (Italy) Francesco Castellacci	Aston Martin V8 Vantage GTE	M	166	+35 Laps
20	LMGTE; Am	96	(United Kingdom) Aston Martin Racing	(Germany) Roald Goethe (United Kingdom) Stuart Hall (Italy) Francesco Castellacci	Aston Martin 4.5 L V8	M	166	+35 Laps
21	LMGTE; Am	88	(Germany) Abu Dhabi-Proton Racing	(Germany) Christian Ried (Austria) Klaus Bachler (United Arab Emirates) Khalded Al Qubaisi	Porsche 911 RSR	M	166	+35 Laps
21	LMGTE; Am	88	(Germany) Abu Dhabi-Proton Racing	(Germany) Christian Ried (Austria) Klaus Bachler (United Arab Emirates) Khalded Al Qubaisi	Porsche 4.0 L Flat-6	M	166	+35 Laps
22	LMP2	35	(France) OAK Racing	(France) Jacques Nicolet (France) Jean-Marc Merlin (France) Erik Maris	Ligier JS P2	D	165	+36 Laps
22	LMP2	35	(France) OAK Racing	(France) Jacques Nicolet (France) Jean-Marc Merlin (France) Erik Maris	Nissan VK45DE 4.5 L V8	D	165	+36 Laps
23	LMGTE; Am	77	(Germany) Dempsey Racing-Proton	(United States) Patrick Dempsey (United States) Patrick Long (Germany) Marco Seefried	Porsche 911 RSR	M	165	+36 Laps
23	LMGTE; Am	77	(Germany) Dempsey Racing-Proton	(United States) Patrick Dempsey (United States) Patrick Long (Germany) Marco Seefried	Porsche 4.0 L Flat-6	M	165	+36 Laps
24	LMP2	31	(United States) Extreme Speed Motorsports	(United States) Ed Brown (Australia) David Brabham (United States) Jon Fogarty	HPD ARX-03b	D	165	+36 Laps
24	LMP2	31	(United States) Extreme Speed Motorsports	(United States) Ed Brown (Australia) David Brabham (United States) Jon Fogarty	Honda HR28TT 2.8 L Turbo V6	D	165	+36 Laps
25	LMGTE; Am	50	(France) Larbre Compétition	(Italy) Gianluca Roda (Italy) Paolo Ruberti (Denmark) Kristian Poulsen	Chevrolet Corvette C7.R	M	160	+41 Laps
25	LMGTE; Am	50	(France) Larbre Compétition	(Italy) Gianluca Roda (Italy) Paolo Ruberti (Denmark) Kristian Poulsen	Chevrolet 5.5 L V8	M	160	+41 Laps
DNF	LMP1	4	(Austria) Team ByKolles	(Switzerland) Simon Trummer (Italy) Vitantonio Liuzzi (Austria) Christian Klien	CLM P1/01	M	116	Retired
DNF	LMP1	4	(Austria) Team ByKolles	(Switzerland) Simon Trummer (Italy) Vitantonio Liuzzi (Austria) Christian Klien	AER P60 Turbo V6	M	116	Retired
DNF	LMP1	17	(Germany) Porsche Team	(Germany) Timo Bernhard (New Zealand) Brendon Hartley (Australia) Mark Webber	Porsche 919 Hybrid	M	44	Drivetrain
DNF	LMP1	17	(Germany) Porsche Team	(Germany) Timo Bernhard (New Zealand) Brendon Hartley (Australia) Mark Webber	Porsche 2.0 L Turbo V4	M	44	Drivetrain
DNF	LMP2	36	(France) Signatech Alpine	(France) Nelson Panciatici (France) Paul-Loup Chatin (France) Vincent Capillaire	Alpine A450b	D	20	Accident
DNF	LMP2	36	(France) Signatech Alpine	(France) Nelson Panciatici (France) Paul-Loup Chatin (France) Vincent Capillaire	Nissan VK45DE 4.5 L V8	D	20	Accident
EX	LMP2	30	(United States) Extreme Speed Motorsports	(United States) Scott Sharp (United Kingdom) Ryan Dalziel (Denmark) David Heinemeier Hansson	HPD ARX-03b	D	183	Disqualified
EX	LMP2	30	(United States) Extreme Speed Motorsports	(United States) Scott Sharp (United Kingdom) Ryan Dalziel (Denmark) David Heinemeier Hansson	Honda HR28TT 2.8 L Turbo V6	D	183	Disqualified

Tyre manufacturers
Key
Symbol	Tyre manufacturer
**D**	Dunlop
**M**	Michelin

== Standings after the race ==
World Endurance Drivers' Championship standings
Pos.	+/–	Driver	Points
1		(Switzerland) Marcel Fässler (Germany) André Lotterer (France) Benoît Tréluyer	25
2		(France) Romain Dumas (Switzerland) Neel Jani (Germany) Marc Lieb	18
3		(Switzerland) Sébastien Buemi (United Kingdom) Anthony Davidson (Japan) Kazuki Nakajima	15
4		(United Kingdom) Mike Conway (France) Stéphane Sarrazin (Austria) Alexander Wurz	12
5		(France) Loïc Duval (Brazil) Lucas di Grassi (United Kingdom) Oliver Jarvis	10

World Endurance Manufacturers' Championship standings
Pos.	+/–	Constructor	Points
1		(Germany) Audi	35
2		(Japan) Toyota	27
3		(Germany) Porsche	15

- Note: Only the top five positions are included for the Drivers' Championship standings.

FIA World Endurance Championship
Previous race: None	2015 season	Next race: 6 Hours of Spa-Francorchamps
