= 91.2 FM =

FM radio frequency

The following radio stations broadcast on 91.2 MHz.

== France ==
- Radio Le Mans (English language radio coverage of the Le Mans 24 Hours)

== Hong Kong ==
- Commercial Radio Hong Kong CR2 FM 90.3

== Indonesia ==
- RRI Programa 1 in Jakarta

== Japan ==
- Nankai Broadcasting in Kawanoe, Ehime
- Nankai Broadcasting in Yawatahama, Ehime

== Turkey ==
- TRT-2 at Hatay
