= Shea Adam =

American-Canadian auto racing reporter

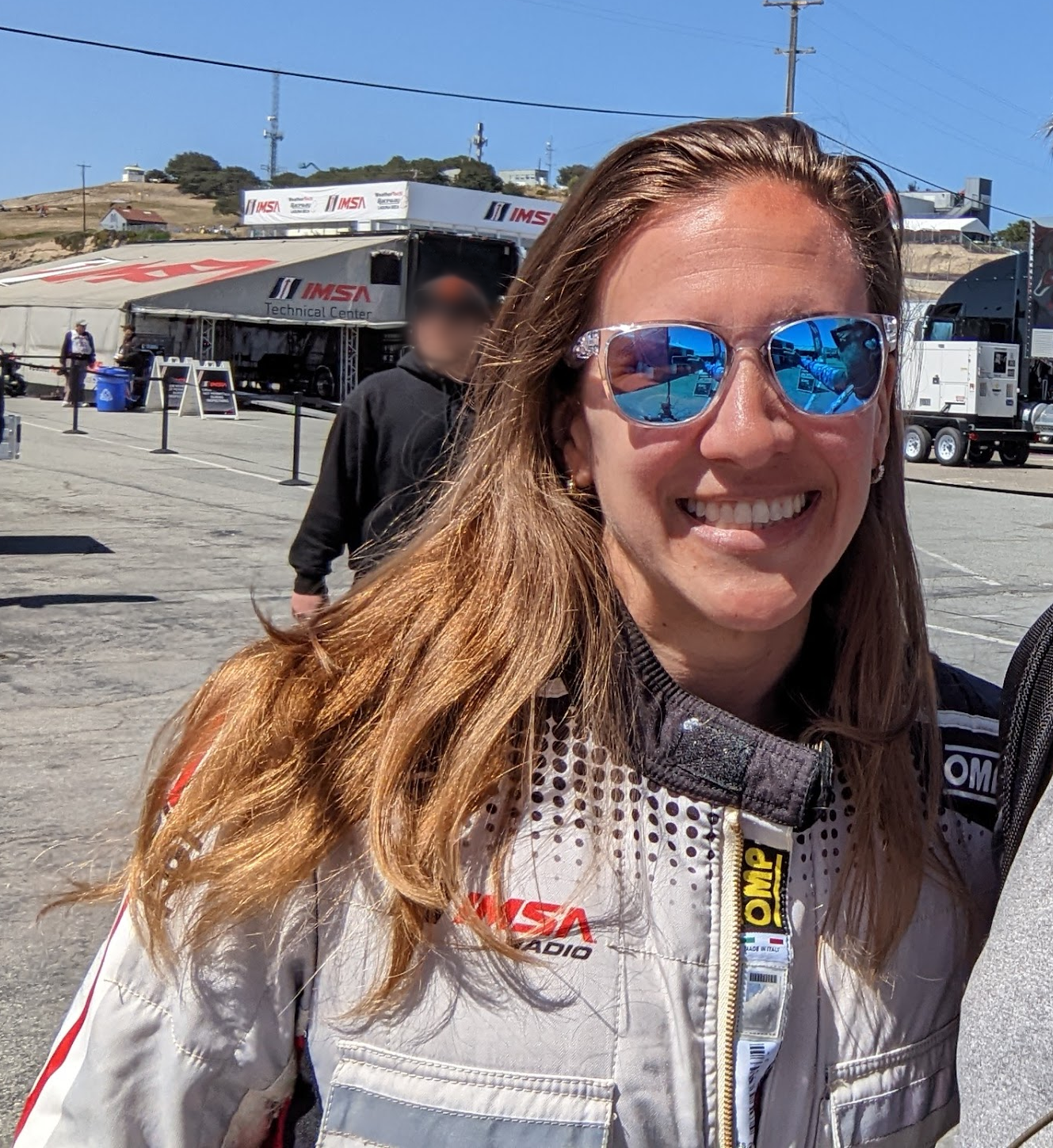
- Adam at Laguna Seca in 2022
- Born: January 11, 1990 (age 35)
- Education: Palmer Trinity School; Florida State University
- Occupation: Auto racing reporter
- Father: Bill Adam

Shea Adam (born January 11, 1990) is an American-Canadian motorsport reporter on television and radio. She is best known for her work with IMSA and its support series through Radio Le Mans, but has also worked for IndyCar, GT World Challenge America and the Bathurst 12 Hour.

== Early life and education ==
Shea Adam was born on January 11, 1990. Adam's mother is a former news anchor for Miami ABC affiliate WPLG, and her father, Bill Adam, was a race car driver for 42 years and commentated on racing events for 10 years. She attended Palmer Trinity School in Miami, before earning degrees in creative writing and history from Florida State University in 2011.

== Career ==
Following her graduation, Adam worked for a car dealership which entailed the delivery of press cars across the state of Florida. She acted as a grid girl at Mid-Ohio Sports Car Course in 2011. Adam met Radio Le Mans commentator and owner John Hindhaugh at the 2012 24 Hours of Daytona. Hindhaugh later offered her a job reporting from the pit lane at the 24 Hours of Le Mans in June of that year.

Adam worked as a graphics supervisor for the American Le Mans Series, a role she held for the 2012 and 2013 seasons. She later transitioned into reporting, making her radio broadcast debut at the 24 Hours of Le Mans. In July 2013, she joined Canadian sports network Sportsnet as a reporter for its telecast of the 2013 Honda Indy Toronto. Adam worked alongside her father Bill, making it the first time a father and daughter worked together on a Canadian motorsports broadcast.

She joined IMSA Radio in 2015 and has acted as a pit lane reporter in the WeatherTech SportsCar Championship and its support series. Adam has covered the Trans-Am Series and Bathurst 12 Hour since then. She was part of the CBS Sports Network broadcast team for its coverage of the 2017 Pirelli World Challenge, and the Mazda Raceway California 8 Hours.

In 2019, Adam served as the color commentator for the Forza RC, the esport version of Forza Motorsport 7.
