= Mobil 1 The Grid =

- Genre: Motorsport
- Presented by: Eddy Temple-Morris, Charlie Brougham, John Hindhaugh
- Theme music composer: BMG Music
- Country of origin: United Kingdom
- Original language: English
- No. of seasons: 14
- No. of episodes: 306

Production
- Executive producer: Ian Sollors
- Producers: Chris Luke, Roger Setchell, Greg Wood
- Production locations: London, UK
- Editors: Rachel Inman, Daniel Baker, Alice Beecroft, Natasha Tsawayo
- Running time: 25 min. (approx.)
- Production company: Sunset + Vine

Original release
- Release: 2009 – present

Mobil 1 The Grid is a motorsport magazine show, which is aired worldwide by more than 130 broadcasters each month, including CBS Sports Network in North America, beIN Sports, Fox Sports (Australia) and CNBC Globally.

The show is narrated by Eddy Temple-Morris, John Hindhaugh and Charlie Brougham, and supported by lubricant Mobil 1. It is produced by Sunset + Vine. The show first aired in March 2009, with 26 weekly shows during the first year. In 2022, the show is in its 14th season with 10 episodes annually supported by exclusive online features across social media platforms.

== Features ==
Mobil 1 The Grid goes behind the scenes at races worldwide and films exclusive stories on everything on 4 wheels from Formula One to IndyCar and FIA World Endurance Championship to the World Rally Championship.

In 2022 the show has regularly shown features on Formula One World Champion Max Verstappen of Red Bull Racing and the Stewart–Haas Racing and other teams and drivers involved in the NASCAR Cup Series, NASCAR Xfinity Series and NASCAR Truck Series. As well as covering a variety of international races like the 24 Hours of Le Mans, the infamous Bathurst 1000 and the Pikes Peak International Hillclimb. Not only does Mobil 1 The Grid feature global racing on the half-hour TV show, it also publishes exclusive content on its social platforms Twitter and Instagram and the full episodes on YouTube monthly.

== See also ==
- Mobil 1
- Sunset + Vine
