= Ian Collins (broadcaster) =

British broadcaster (born 1966)

- Born: 25 October 1966 (age 59); Scunthorpe, Lincolnshire, England
- Career
- Style: Topical interaction
- Country: England
- Website: iancollins.com

Ian Collins (born 25 October 1966) is a British radio and television presenter, journalist, and author. He hosts the weekday afternoon programme on Talk.

== Career ==
=== Radio ===
Collins began his broadcasting career at Invicta FM in Kent. In 1995, he joined the newly launched Talk Radio UK, later rebranded as Talksport.

From 1995 to 2002, he presented the overnight programme Ian Collins and the Creatures of the Night. He subsequently hosted the late-night weekend programme Ian Collins: Unbranded from 2002 to 2004, succeeding Tommy Boyd. In 2004, he replaced Mike Dickin on the mid-morning show and for a period co-presented with Mike Parry.

In 2006, Collins began hosting The Ultimate Late Show, which he wrote and produced with Alan Hyde. Following the departure of James Whale in 2008, he moved to the station's late-night slot. He also presented The Incredibly Early Breakfast Show.

In February 2012, Collins joined LBC, remaining with the station until September 2018.

From November 2018 to June 2020, he co-presented BBC Radio Kent's breakfast programme The Wake Up Call with Anna Cookson, replacing John Warnett, who moved to the station's drivetime programme.

During 2019, Collins returned to TalkRadio as a stand-in presenter for the weekday afternoon programme. He became the programme's permanent presenter in 2020.

In October 2023, Collins moved from his afternoon slot on TalkTV and TalkRadio to present First Edition, airing weeknights at 22:00 before returning to the afternoon show the following year.

=== Television and writing ===
Collins first appeared on television on the cable channel L!VE TV in the late 1990s. He has also appeared on The Daily Politics, This Week, and London Tonight.

He is the author of I Bet You Won't Read This: Confessions of a Night Time Radio Host (ISBN 0953979806), which includes listener correspondence and advice on entering the radio industry. His second book, 67 People I'd Like to Slap, was published in 2017.

== Personal life ==
Collins is a friend of Danny Wallace and has appeared in Wallace's books Are You Dave Gorman?, Join Me, Yes Man, and Friends Like These.
