= Alan Hyde =

British motorsport journalist and announcer

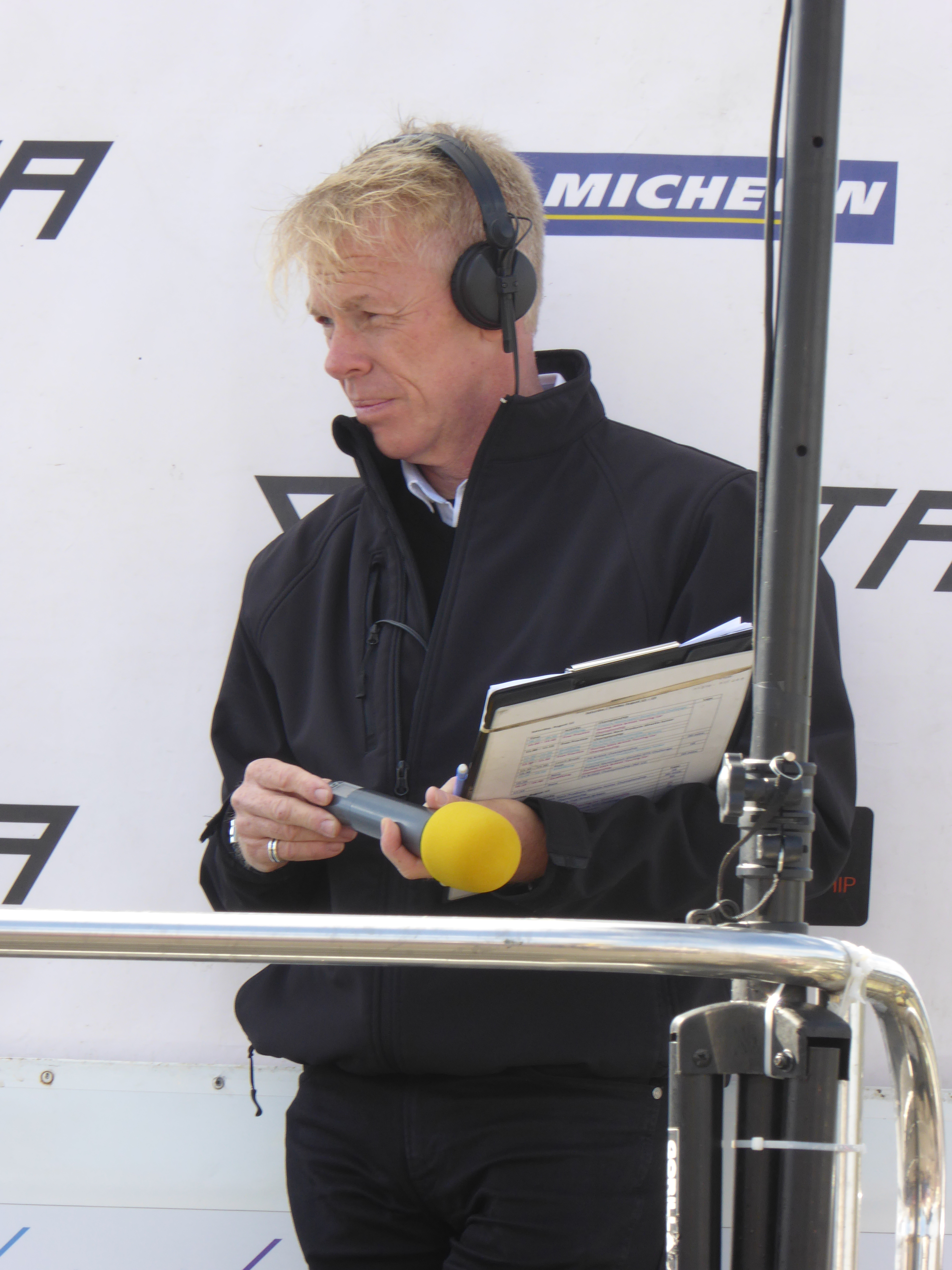
Hyde, at the Knockhill round of the 2017 British Touring Car Championship.

Alan Hyde (born 1 May 1966) is a radio broadcaster, presenter, producer and sound engineer who operates the broadcasting business, Studio 22. He has worked in motorsport journalism, particularly the British Touring Car Championship.

He worked as on-air contributor and producer of The Ultimate Late Show Live with his friend Ian Collins on Talksport, and subsequently contributed motorsport previews and reports to the station.

Since 2012, he has been an English language commentator for the television world feed of the Macau Grand Prix.

In January 2019, Hyde took on the role of interviewer on the Main Stage at Autosport International, a role which continued until 2022.

He has been part of the team behind Silverstone Circuit's radio station, Radio Silverstone, and hosts the BTCC-themed radio show and podcast Tin Top Tuesday, which has enjoyed title-sponsorship from Autoglym, Renault, Toyota GB and Marshall Amplification.

He has also produced motorsport podcasts, including the Motor Sport Magazine podcast, from 2009 until 2021, and has worked regularly with BMW as an international English language presenter, moderator and commentator.

In 2025, he helped launch TOCA Live, a new radio format for the BTCC which took over TOCA Radio. The new format provides news, commentary, interviews, music, competitions and fan engagement across a BTCC race weekend. This is broadcast over the PA system at every circuit, FM radio (only at circuits which offer FM transmission) and online at the BTCC website to listen anywhere in the world.
