= Martin Haven =

British freelance motorsport commentator

Martin Haven is a British freelance motorsport commentator, who lives in Royal Leamington Spa. He is currently on the official commentary team for the World Endurance Championship. He is also the official commentator of the International Bobsleigh & Skeleton Federation races, broadcast on the IBSF YouTube channel.

Haven trained as a radio and print journalist, and after doing circuit commentary he made his TV debut in the late 1980s with BSB, with live coverage of the RAC Rally. He left a role at Autosport to cover NASCAR for Screensport, just as the channel was closed down by owners Eurosport.

Haven has been on the official commentary team for the World Endurance Championship since the 2018-2019 season. Previously, he covered the 24 Hours of Le Mans for Eurosport and, before that, for Motors TV.

Haven has been Eurosport's lead car racing commentator for the past decade and has headed up their coverage of bobsleigh and skeleton since 2001. He commentates for Channel 4 with their British F3 and GT coverage.

Haven also presents Eurosport's coverage of the annual Dakar Rally, and has commentated on the Race of Champions, including doing the in-stadium commentary at Wembley Stadium. Each January, Haven also presents a round-up of the Autosport International show for Motors TV, alongside Diana Binks.

He previously commentated on the World Touring Car Championship and its support races for Eurosport from its inception in 2005, originally with David Leslie, and later alongside former British Touring Car Champion John Cleland. He also commentated for the World Touring Car Cup alongside co-commentator three-time BTCC Champion, Matt Neal. Other series Haven has covered for Eurosport include the FIA GT Championship, Le Mans Series, World Series by Renault, GP2 Series (alongside Gareth Rees) and Porsche Supercup. He also reported for NBC's American Le Mans Series coverage during their five-year tenure.

Haven has also covered Formula E when lead commentator Jack Nicholls has been unable to do so.

As well as motorsport Haven has commentated for Eurosport's and International Bobsleigh & Skeleton Federation's official channel coverage of bobsleigh and skeleton.
