= Passion Radio =

Independent Local Radio station

- England
- Broadcast area: Sussex

Programming
- Format: Dance

Ownership
- Owner: Passion Digital Radio Ltd

History
- First air date: 5 September 2000

Links
- Website: www.passionradio.co.uk

Passion Radio is an Independent Local Radio station that broadcasts from studios in Worthing across Sussex on DAB Digital Radio and around the world on the internet.

Passion Radio's origins can be traced back to 1995 when New Wave Broadcasting, a company the station's founders were involved with, submitted an application to the Radio Authority to run an FM service for Brighton. The licence application wasn't successful, but the brand reappeared in September 2000 as an internet-only station.

Today, Passion Radio plays dance music from four decades mixed with local news, features and information. Presenters include former Big Brother 6 housemate Eugene Sully, Ryan Morrison on drivetime, Brighton's Honey Club resident Adam H, Trance DJ Matt Darey, Graham Gold and former Atlantic 252 presenters Simon Hardwick (who is the managing director of the company) and Dave James.

Passion Radio became one of the first commercial radio stations in the UK to take part in a trial of Digital Radio Mondiale and could be heard in parts of Sussex on 1386 kHz DRM.

The station was granted a temporary 28-day FM restricted service licence by Ofcom and broadcast from 1 May 2006 on 87.7 FM in Brighton and Hove. On 24 May 2006 Passion Radio switched on its DAB transmission, broadcasting on the Now Sussex Coast multiplex to a potential audience of 715,000 digital listeners. However by August 2007 the DAB transmission has stopped, no notice or details have been given for this, but the station has been removed from Now Sussex Coast multiplex line up website.

The station is based in the Guildbourne Centre in Worthing, sharing premises with 107.7 Splash FM.

Most of Passion's shows are 'voice-tracked', in keeping with other digital stations, although the station does broadcast regular live shows and outside broadcasts.
