= Bill Adam =

Canadian racing driver (born 1946)

Bill Adam (born May 25, 1946) is a Canadian racing driver born in Airdrie, North Lanarkshire, Scotland.

Children: Kristopher Adam, Damen Adam, Shea Adam.

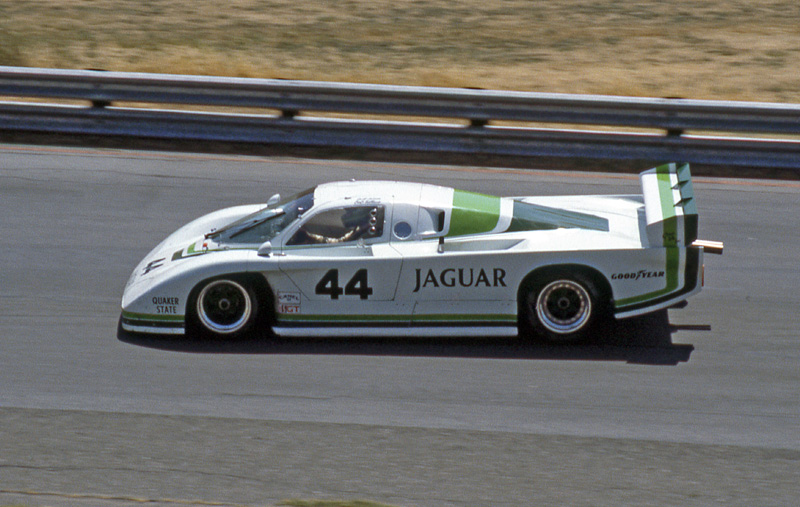
Adam co-drove a Jaguar XJR-5 with Bob Tullius at Sears Point in 1983.

Starting his career in sports cars toward the end of the 1970s, Adam drove as a privateer, winning a Canadian championship before being hired professionally. Invited to join the factory backed Group 44 race team in 1980, he spent time co-driving with Bob Tullius in the Triumph TR8 in the IMSA series and had GTO class victories at the 12 Hours of Sebring, Road Atlanta, Mosport, and Road America, as well as a victory at Daytona where he drove alone. In mid-1982, the team unveiled its Prototype Jaguar GTP racer, and it finished third at its first race ever at Road America. In the 1983 season, Adam and Tullius led almost every race but the car proved fragile, although it they did win Road Atlanta, Lime Rock, Mosport and Pocono races. In 1985, Adam joined Conte Racing, co driving with John Paul Jr. in the factory-backed March GTP racer. Power came from a factory engine program at Buick, a V-6 turbo motor that put out in excess of 1000HP. Unfortunately, the power of this engine was more than the chassis could handle and it led almost every race, but broke down in almost every race. Following years were spent with Bayside Racing from Seattle, Washington in their Porsche 962 GTP racer, as well as the Hendricks Motorsport Chevrolet Corvette GTP racer. 1986 & 1987 were also spent in the Rothmans Porsche Cup in Canada with numerous victories as well as winning a prestigious Porsche Cup award, something given out to the world's top Porsche racers. At the 1987 24 Hours of Le Mans, driving a Porsche 962C for Porsche Canada/Brun Motorsport, Adam teamed with Scott Goodyear and Richard Spenard, running as high as fifth overall before stopping with engine problems. One season was spent with the Protofab race team, racing a factory backed effort in both Camaro and Corvette race cars before spending a few years out of motorsport. 1994 saw Adam return to racing, driving the Champion Racing Porsche. Along with co-drivers including John Paul Jr., Juan Manuel Fangio II, Brian Redman, and Thierry Boutsen, he had a second-place finish at the Sebring 12 Hour with Hans-Joachim Stuck in 1995 and second place at Watkins Glen International. He would return in 1996 with Stuck to win the 12 hour Sebring GT1 class. In 1997, he placed second in class, again with Stuck and Boutsen, at the 24 Hours of Daytona.

In 2002, Adam drove two races of the Porsche Supercup at the Indianapolis Motor Speedway on United States Grand Prix weekend, placing 11th and 13th. The following year he was driving the number 23 Porsche 911 twice, in the Grand-Am Motorola Cup. He qualified the car second on the grid at Mont Tremblant.

Adam has been racing an Audi R8 (chassis 405) in the Historic Sports car Racing series, winning the Daytona WSC Enduro race in November 2005. In 2008, Adam, while driving for Jim Rogers, won the overall HSR Championship, placing first in four races and second in the other three in which he partook. In 2010, Adam continued driving for Jim Rogers in a "new" Audi R8. This car, chassis 607, was unraced and used as a showcar by Audi, before being completely gone over by ex Champion crew chief Bobby Green. Teamed with Butch Leitzinger, Adam won the opening HSR race at Sebring for the team's first victory with this car. Road Atlanta and the "Mitty" followed, where teamed with Andy Wallace, they placed second. The rest of the year was complete domination by the Adam/Wallace team as they won at Road America, Wisconsin and followed with pole positions AND wins at Road Atlanta (September), Homestead Miami Speedway, and the Sebring finale, winning the HSR Championship. He is the father of auto racing reporter Shea Adam.
