= John Hindhaugh =

Sports commentator

John Hindhaugh (born 1962) is a sports commentator and broadcaster from Sunderland, England. He resides in Thrapston, Northamptonshire, United Kingdom with his wife Eve Hewitt, the managing director of Radio Show Limited, the production company of Radio Le Mans and IMSA radio, a company they own together.

Hindhaugh is most closely associated with Radio Le Mans, where he debuted in 1989. However his voice can also be heard on motorsport commentary on ITV, Motors TV, Mobil 1 The Grid, XM Satellite Radio and the video game Need For Speed: Pro Street. Hindhaugh was also part of the very first online live stream for the Race of Champions alongside Bruce Jones.

Hindhaugh was also part of the commentary team for American Le Mans Series working alongside Greg Creamer and Jeremy Shaw. The American Le Mans Series ended in 2013 when it merged with Grand-Am Road Racing in 2014 and became United SportsCar Championship. Unfortunately Hindhaugh was not part of the commentary team for the inaugural season, however, he and Radio Le Mans return for 2015 when they produce IMSA radio.

Midway through the 2014 World Endurance Championship Hindhaugh was appointed part of the TV commentary team for the broadcast of the World Endurance Championship to all English speaking countries receiving the world feed. Hindhaugh was joined by Graham Goodwin, editor of dailysportscar.com

Hindhaugh was also featured in the 2008 documentary Truth in 24 about the Audi Le Mans team as it prepared and raced throughout the 2008 24 Hours of Le Mans.

Hindhaugh has also been involved with GT Academy as a judge and also as the commentator of the show down race, which aired at 8:00pm, on Monday 25 February 2013 on ITV4.

Hindhaugh has also commentated on RC car racing, as he provided the commentary for the 3rd leg of the 2009 IFMAR 1/10 Scale World Championships A Final.

He has previously worked for the BBC and commentated on sports as diverse as ice hockey, basketball, cycling, equestrianism and football.

== Racing ==
Hindhaugh made his Ginetta GT4 Supercup debut on the weekend of 6/7 September 2014 behind the wheel of a Team LNT run car, at Rockingham Motor Speedway Hindhaugh competed in round 21 and round 22 in the Supercar GT Championship.

Hindhaugh also entered the 360 Motor Racing Club in 2013 and 2014 (results) at Donington Park in aid of the Stroke Association in 2013 and cancer research in 2014.

Hindhaugh raced for Aston Martin Lagonda in the 2017 COTA 24 Hours with Andy Palmer, Peter Cate and Paul Hollywood. They finished second in the SP3 class and twentieth overall.
