= Leena Gade =

British race engineer

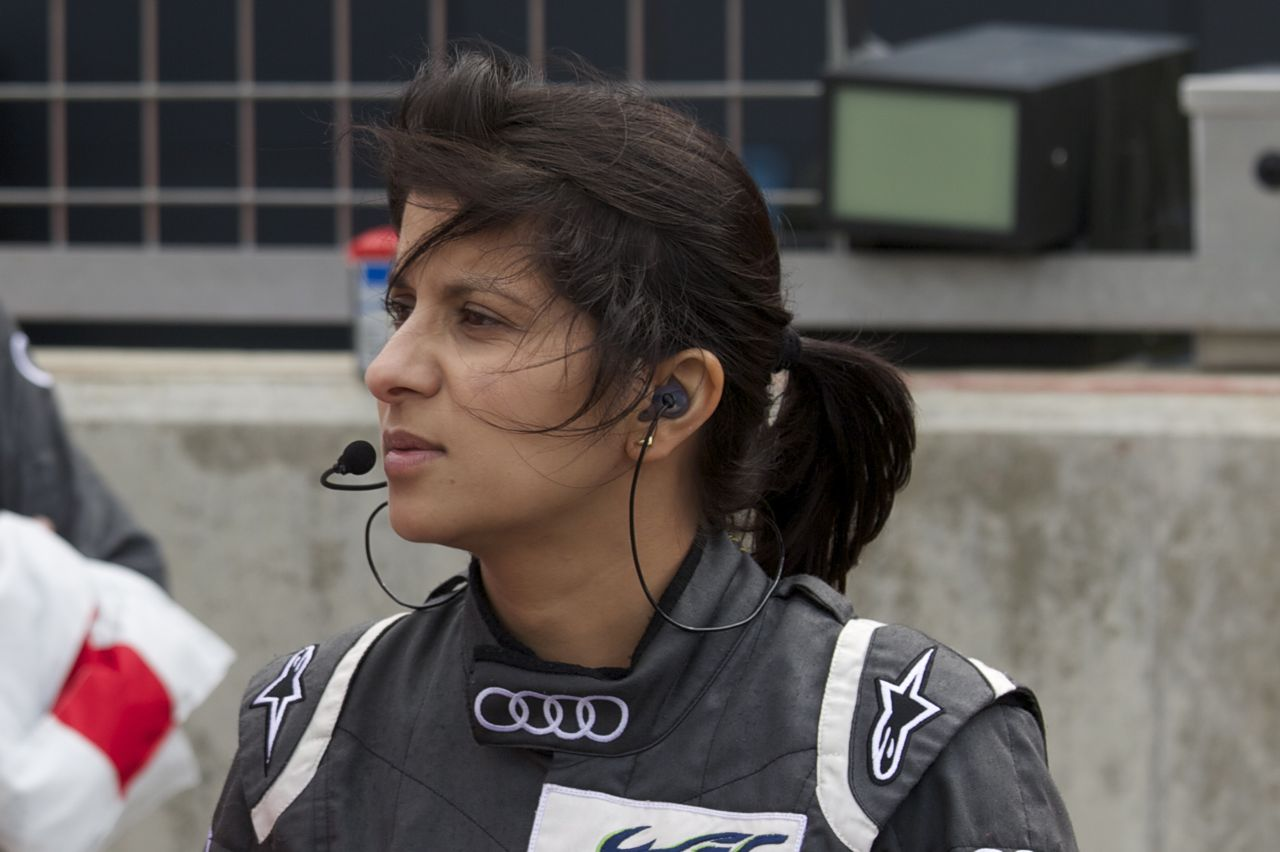
- Born: 1975 or 1976 (age 50–51); Perivale, United Kingdom
- Education: University of Manchester
- Occupation: Race engineer
- Known for: First female race engineer to win the 24 Hours of Le Mans

Leena Gade is a British race engineer who has served as a lead race engineer in the FIA World Endurance Championship and IndyCar race series. In 2011, she became the first female race engineer to win the 24 Hours of Le Mans. In 2012, she won the FIA World Endurance Championship's 'Man of the Year' award and the C&R Racing Woman in Technology Award. She is also an Ambassador of the FIA Commission for Women in Motorsport.

== Early life and education ==
Leena Gade was born in Perivale, United Kingdom, the daughter of Indian immigrants. She is one of three sisters. She grew up in England with the exception of the three years between the ages of 9 and 12, which her family spent in India. During that time she and her younger sister Teena became interested in engineering. When they returned to England both girls started watching Formula One racing. Gade has said that they became "obsessive" fans, attracted not by the sport's glamour but by their fascination with "what the machines could do". Leena Gade's sister Teena also became a race engineer.

Leena Gade studied engineering at the University of Manchester, and graduated with a Master of Science degree in aerospace engineering in 1998. She entered the university as one of five female students in a class of 100.

== Career ==
After university, Gade worked as a vehicle refinement engineer for Jaguar Cars for six and a half years. Meanwhile, she worked part-time as an engineer on racing teams in the Formula BMW, A1 Grand Prix, and GT racing classes. In 2006, she went to the 24 Hours of Le Mans for the first time as part of the Chamberlain Synergy Le Mans Prototype team. She went to work for Audi Sport Team Joest in 2007. In 2011, she became the first female race engineer to win at Le Mans, with drivers André Lotterer, Benoît Tréluyer and Marcel Fässler. She and her team won again in 2012 and 2014. In 2012, Gade moved to Germany, where she worked on developing new race cars for Audi in addition to being a race engineer. As the Audi LMP1 was closed in 2016, Gade left to work for Bentley Motorsport.

In December 2012, Gade was named FIA World Endurance Championship 'Man of the Year', and in the same month she received the C&R Racing Women in Technology award. In 2013, she was named an ambassador for the FIA Commission for Women in Motorsport. She was a Formula Student ambassador in 2013 and 2014.

In 2018, she took the role as race engineer for James Hinchcliffe as part of Schmidt Peterson Motorsports's IndyCar program on the No. 5 car. Gade and the team parted ways after Hinchcliffe failed to qualify for the 2018 Indianapolis 500.

In 2019, Gade was hired by Canada's Multimatic to engineer the No. 77 Mazda RT24-P Daytona Prototype International (DPi) entry in the WeatherTech Sportscar Championship. Later that year, she was appointed president of the FIA GT Commission overseeing global grand tourer racing.

Gade joined Ford Racing in 2026 to develop the new LMDh set to debut at the World Endurance Championship in 2027.
