= The Passion =

The Passion may refer to:

- Passion of Jesus, in Christianity, the Passion is the short final period in the life of Jesus
- The Passion (novel), a 1987 novel by British novelist Jeannette Winterson
- The Passion (franchise), passion play event held in multiple countries
- The Passion of the Christ, a 2004 film
- The Passion of Christ (Strasbourg), 15th century paintings
- The Passion: New Orleans, a 2016 live television event, produced by Tyler Perry
- The Passion (TV serial), a miniseries about Jesus, broadcast in 2008
- The Passion (TV series), a 1999 TV drama series set in Devon

== See also ==
- Passion (disambiguation)
