= Country Music Association Award for Video of the Year =

American country music award

- Country: United States
- Presented by: Country Music Association
- First award: 1985
- Currently held by: Ella Langley (2026)

The Country Music Association Awards is a major awards show in country music. Formerly known as the Music Video of the Year Award, Video of the Year was originally presented at the 1985 Country Music Association Awards. The category honours excellence in country music videos that have been released during the eligibility years and is awarded to both the artist and the director. Below are the winners and nominees of the award.

he inaugural recipients of the award were Hank Williams Jr. and John Goodhue in 1985 for "All My Rowdy Friends Are Coming Over Tonight", with Martina McBride becoming the first female winner of the award in 1994 for "Independence Day" and Trey Fanjoy becoming the first female director winner in 2009 for Taylor Swift's "Love Story". Among artists, Brad Paisley holds the record for most wins in the category, with four, while two-time recipient Alan Jackson has a leading twelve nominations. Carrie Underwood holds the record for most nominations without a win, with six. Among directors, Fanjoy and Michael Salomon are tied for most wins in the category, with three each, while Fanjoy leads with a record eighteen nominations. Jack Cole and Jon Small are tied for most nominations without a win, with six. The current holders of the award are Lainey Wilson and Patrick Tracy for the video to Wilson's hit single "Wildflowers and Wild Horses".

== Recipients ==
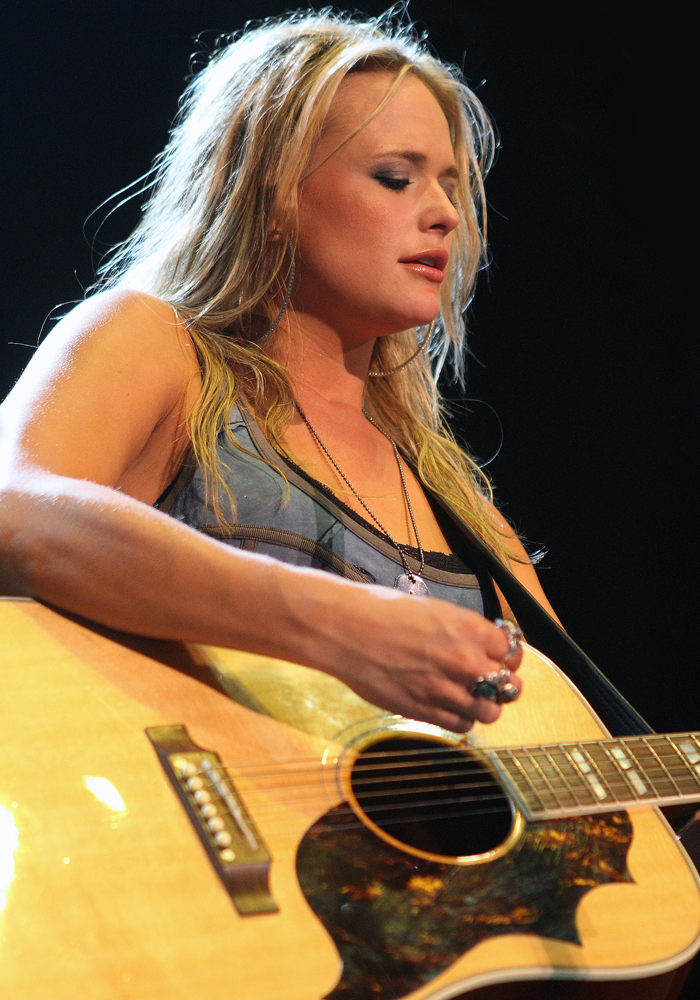
Miranda Lambert received the award in 2010 and 2020.

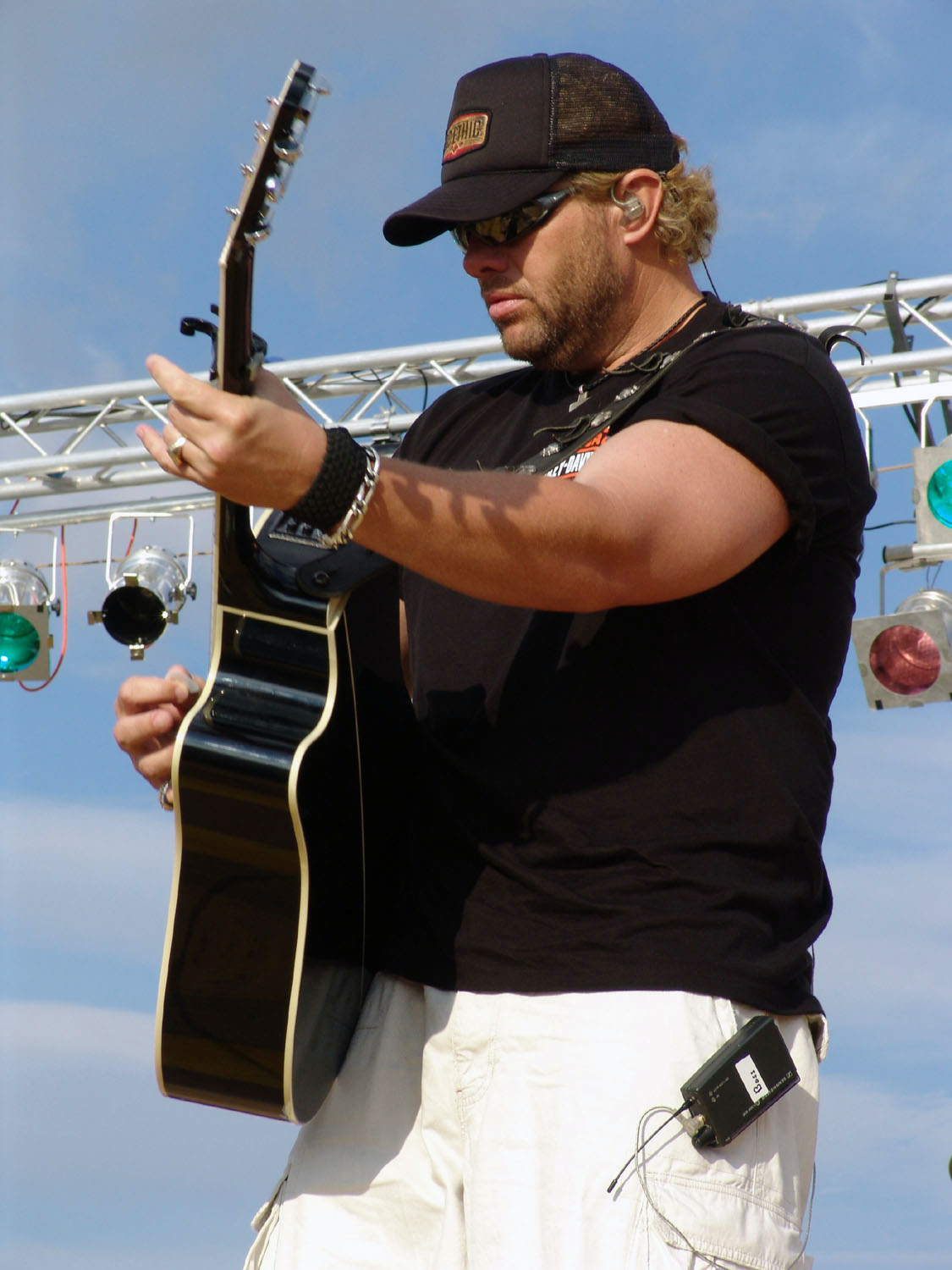
Two-time winner Toby Keith.

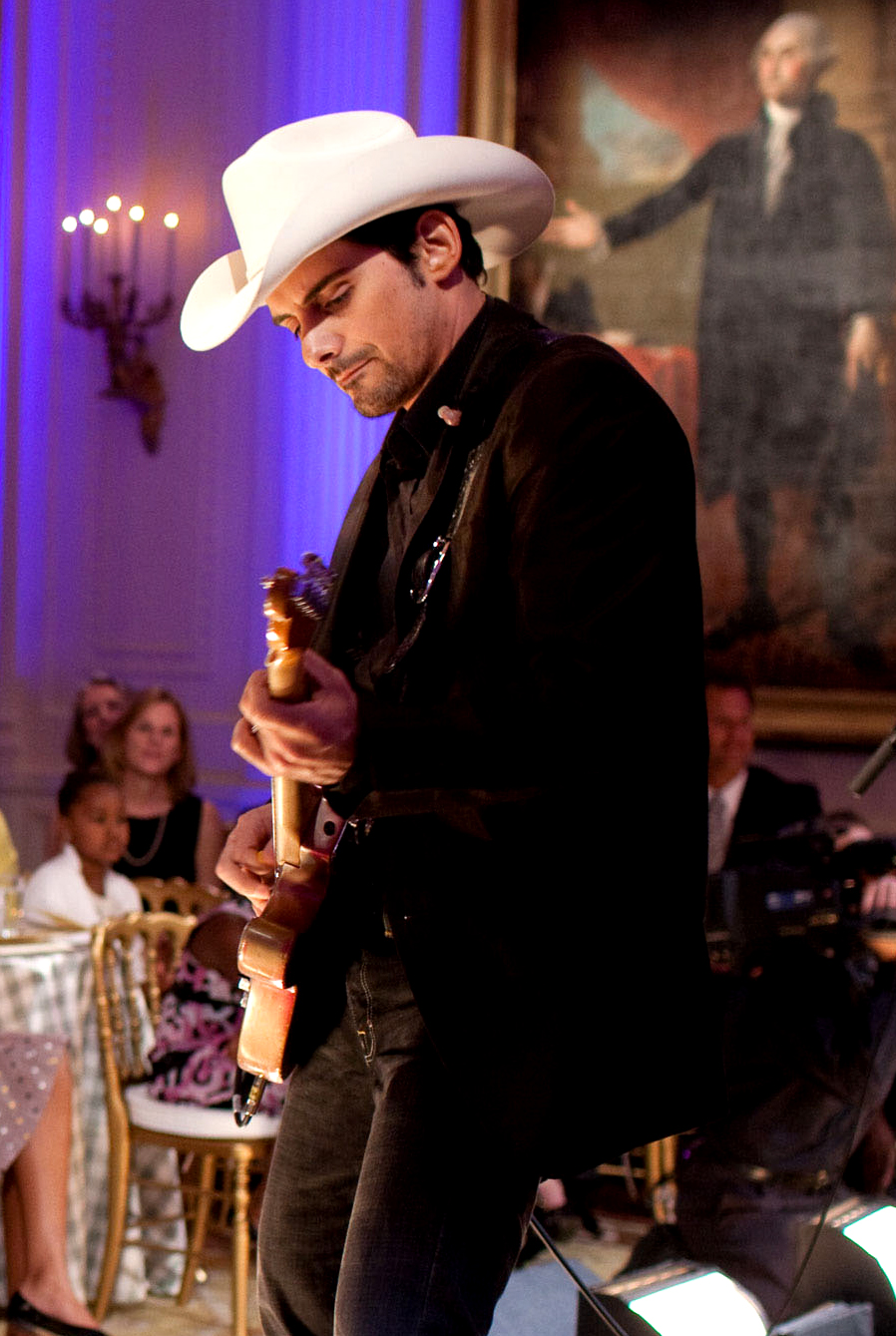
Brad Paisley holds the record for most wins in this category, with four.

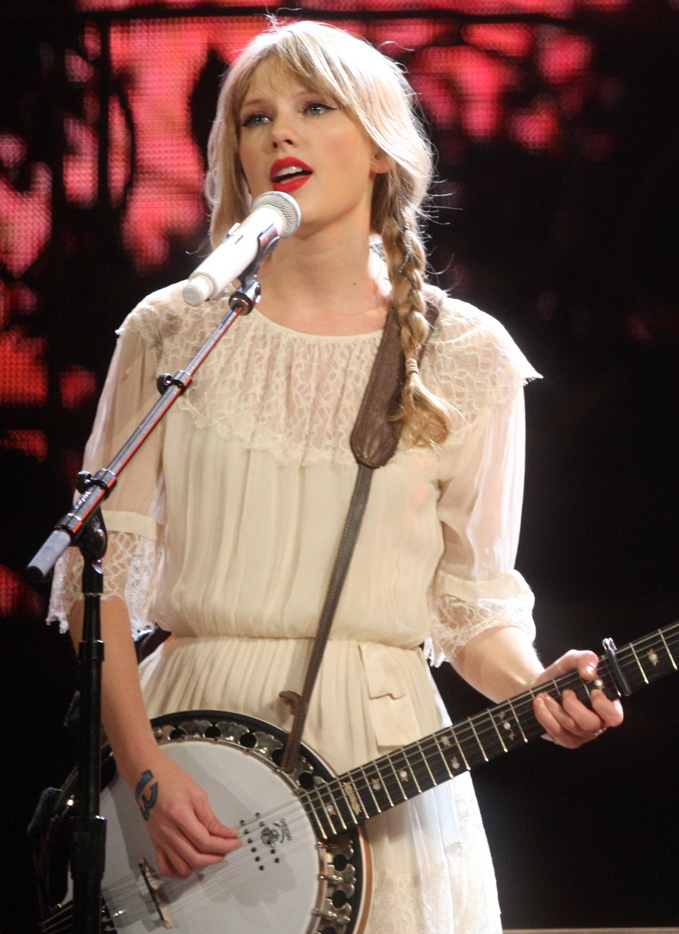
Taylor Swift won the award in 2009 and 2013.

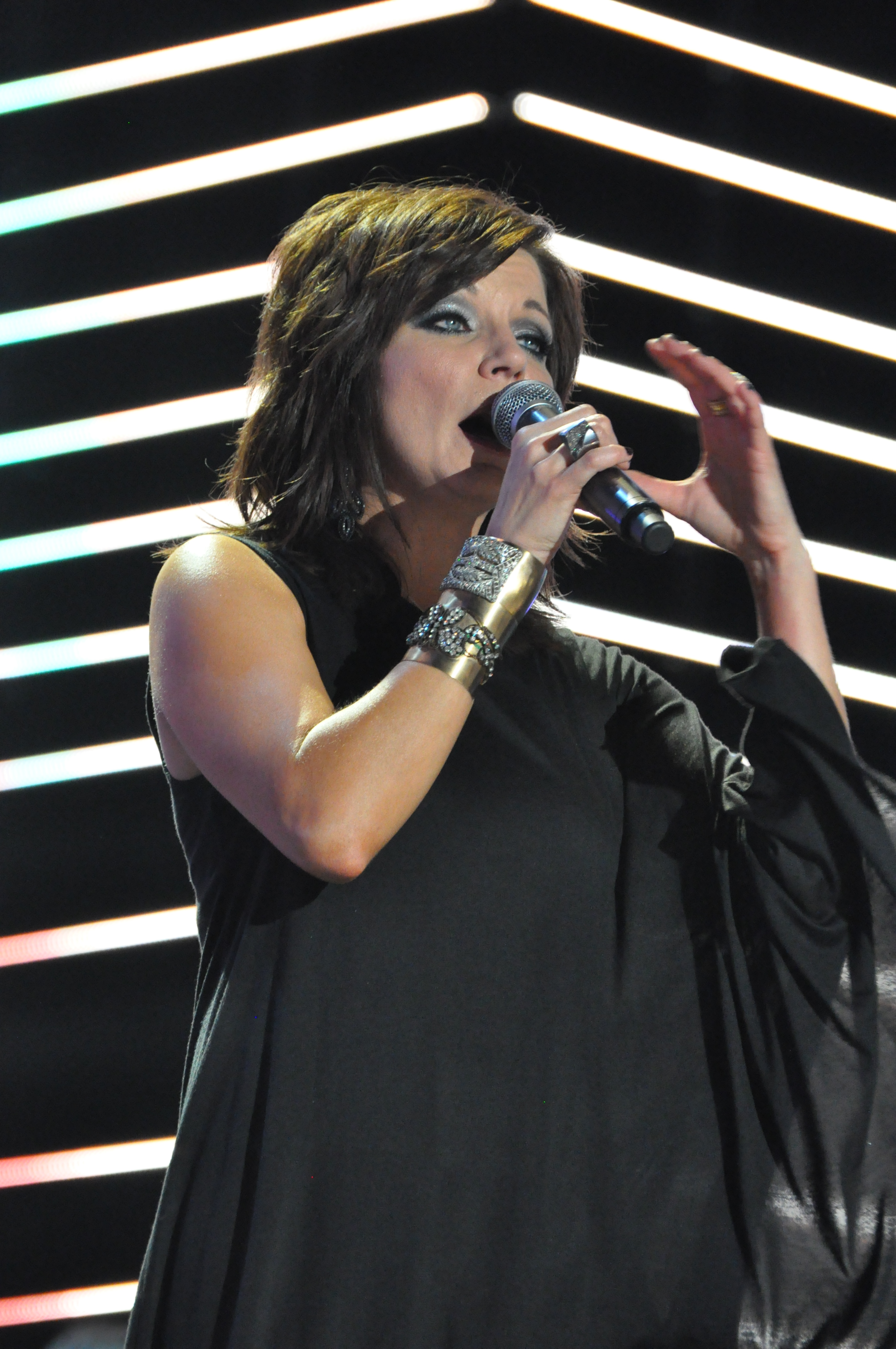
Martina McBride was the first woman to receive the award, winning for the video of her classic hit "Independence Day".

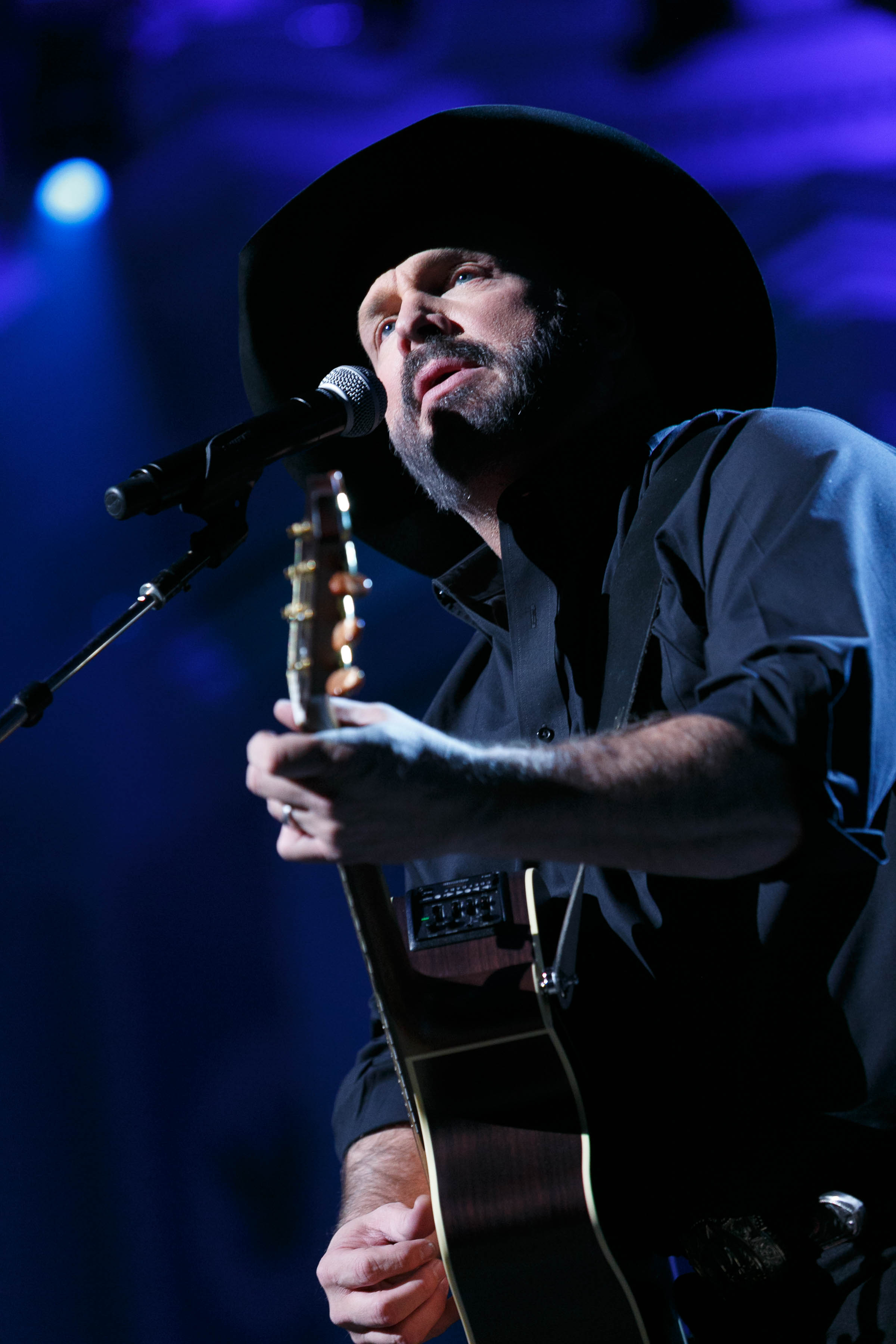
Two-time recipient Garth Brooks won consecutively in 1990 and 1991.

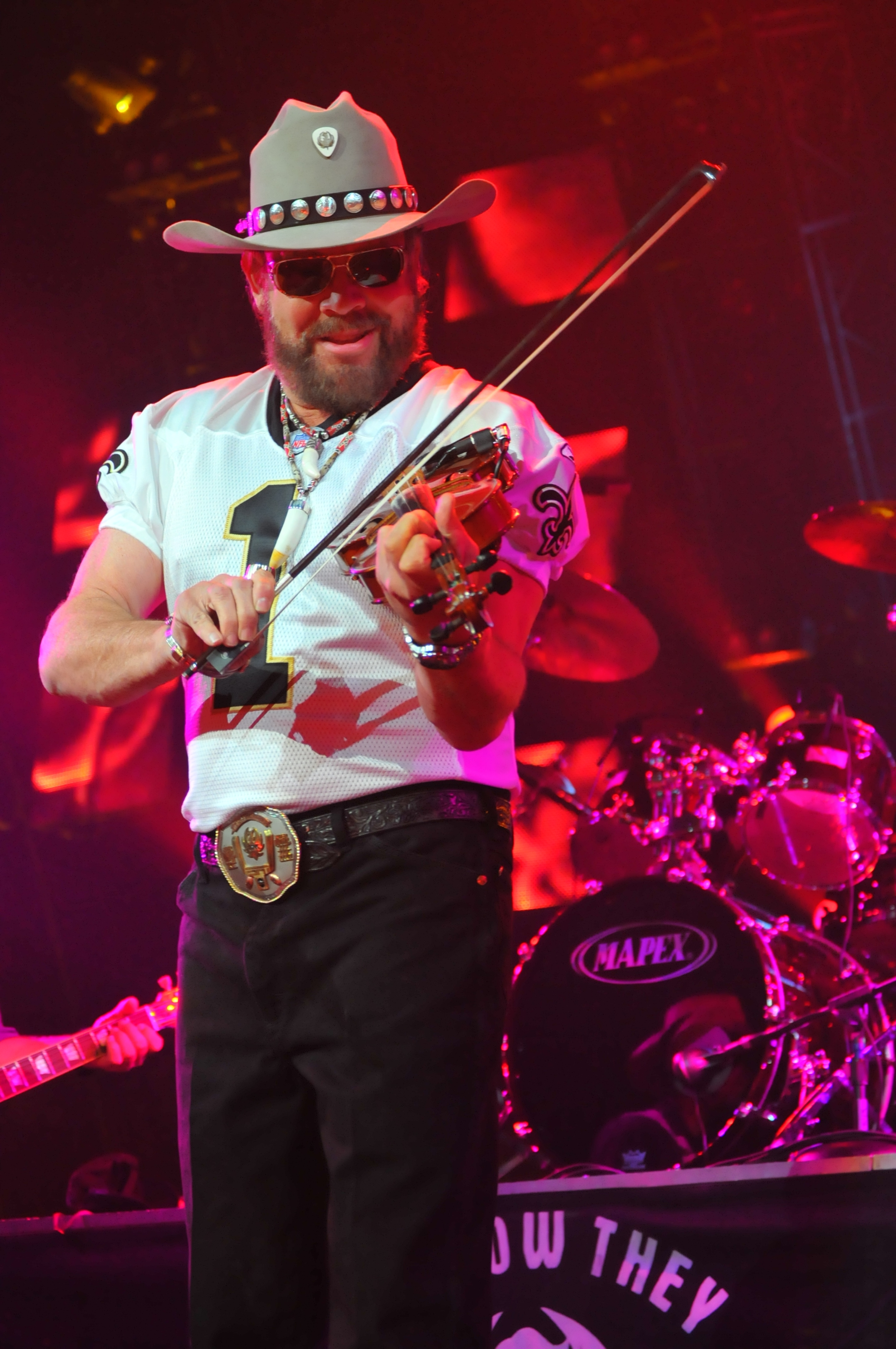
Inaurural winner and three-time recipient Hank Williams Jr.

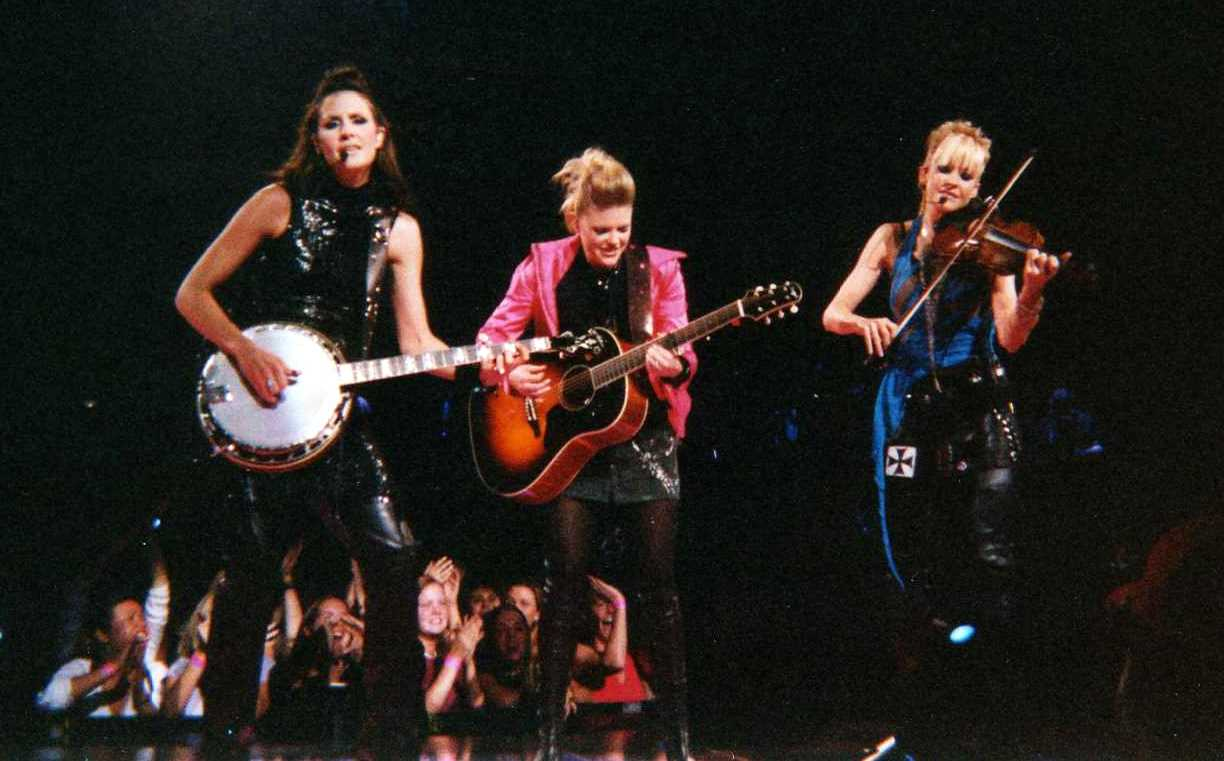
Two-time honorees Dixie Chicks.

Year	Winner	Work	Nominees
2026	Ella Langley; (as Artist and Director); Caylee Robillard; Wales Toney	”Choosin’ Texas”	“Dry Spell” — Kacey Musgraves; Hannah Lux Davis and Kacey Musgraves; “Gary” — Stephen Wilson Jr.; Tim Cofield; “The Fall” — Cody Johnson; Dustin Haney; “White Horse” — Chris Stapleton; Running Bear
2025	Ella Langley (as Artist and Director); Riley Green; John Park; Wales Toney	"You Look Like You Love Me”	“Am I Okay?” — Megan Moroney; Alexandra Gavillet, Megan Moroney; ”I'm Gonna Love You” — Cody Johnson (ft. Carrie Underwood); Dustin Haney; “Somewhere Over Laredo” — Lainey Wilson; TK McKamy; "Think I'm in Love with You” — Chris Stapleton; Running Bear
2024	Lainey Wilson; Patrick Tracy	"Wildflowers and Wild Horses"	"Dirt Cheap" - Cody Johnson, Dustin Haney; "I Had Some Help" - Post Malone, Morgan Wallen, Chris Villa; "I'm Not Pretty" - Megan Moroney, Jeff Johnson; "The Painter" - Cody Johnson, Dustin Haney
2023	Hardy; Lainey Wilson; Justin Clough	"Wait in the Truck"	"Light On in the Kitchen" - Ashley McBryde, Reid Long; "Memory Lane" - Old Dominion, Mason Allen, Nicki Fletcher; "Need a Favor" - Jelly Roll, Patrick Tohill; "Next Thing You Know" - Jordan Davis, Running Bear
2022	Cody Johnson; Dustin Haney	"'Til You Can't"	Taylor Swift, Chris Stapleton, Blake Lively - "I Bet You Think About Me"; Midland, Jon Pardi, Harper Smith - "Longneck Way to Go"; Cole Swindell, Lainey Wilson, Michael Monaco - "Never Say Never"; Carly Pearce, Ashley McBryde, Alexa Campbell - "Never Wanted to Be That Girl"
2021	Kelsea Ballerini; Kenny Chesney; Patrick Tracy	"Half of My Hometown"	Maren Morris, Ryan Hurd, TK McKamy - "Chasing After You"; Chris Young, Kane Brown, Peter Zavadil - "Famous Friends"; Dierks Bentley, Wes Edwards, Ed Pryor - "Gone"; Brothers Osborne, Reid Long - "Younger Me"
2020	Miranda Lambert; Trey Fanjoy	"Bluebird"	Dan + Shay, Justin Bieber, Patrick Tracy - "10,000 Hours"; Jake Owen, Justin Clough - "Homemade"; Carly Pearce, Lee Brice, Sam Siske - "I Hope You're Happy Now"; Chris Stapleton, David Coleman - "Second One to Know"
2019	Kacey Musgraves; Hannah Lux Davis	"Rainbow"	Dierks Bentley, Wes Edwards - "Burning Man"; Maren Morris, Dave Meyers - "Girl"; Blake Shelton, Sophie Muller - "God's Country"; Eric Church, Reid Long - "Some of It"
2018	Thomas Rhett; TK McKamy	"Marry Me"	Sugarland, Taylor Swift, Anthony Mandler - "Babe"; Carrie Underwood, Randee St. Nicholas - "Cry Pretty"; Chris Janson, Jeff Venable - "Drunk Girl"; Dan + Shay, Patrick Tracy - "Tequila"
2017	Brothers Osborne; Wes Edwards; Ryan Silver	"It Ain't My Fault"	Little Big Town, Becky Fluke, Reid Long - "Better Man"; Keith Urban, Carter Smith - "Blue Ain't Your Color"; Thomas Rhett, Maren Morris, TK McKamy - "Craving You"; Miranda Lambert, Trey Fanjoy - "Vice"
2016	Chris Stapleton; Tim Mattia	"Fire Away"	Cam, Trey Fanjoy - "Burning House"; Tim McGraw, Wes Edwards - "Humble and Kind"; Eric Church, Reid Long, John Peets - "Record Year"; Dierks Bentley, Wes Edwards - "Somewhere on a Beach"
2015	Maddie & Tae; TK McKamy	"Girl in a Country Song"	Kacey Musgraves, Marc Klasfeld - "Biscuits"; Little Big Town, Kayla Welch, Matthew Welch - "Girl Crush"; Miranda Lambert, Trey Fanjoy - "Little Red Wagon"; Carrie Underwood, Raj Kapoor - "Something in the Water"
2014	Dierks Bentley; Wes Edwards	"Drunk on a Plane"	Miranda Lambert, Trey Fanjoy - "Automatic"; Lady Antebellum, Shane Drake - "Bartender"; Kacey Musgraves, Honey - "Follow Your Arrow"; Miranda Lambert, Carrie Underwood, Trey Fanjoy - "Somethin' Bad"
2013	Tim McGraw; Taylor Swift; Keith Urban; Shane Drake	"Highway Don't Care"	Carrie Underwood, Randee St. Nicholas - "Blown Away"; Blake Shelton, Pistol Annies, Trey Fanjoy - "Boys 'Round Here"; Lady Antebellum, Peter Zavadil - "Downtown"; Miranda Lambert, Trey Fanjoy - "Mama's Broken Heart"; Little Big Town, Shane Drake - "Tornado"
2012	Toby Keith; Michael Salomon	"Red Solo Cup"	Kenny Chesney, Shaun Silva - "Come Over"; Miranda Lambert, Trey Fanjoy - "Over You"; Little Big Town, Declan Whitebloom - "Pontoon"; Eric Church, Peter Zavadil - "Springsteen"
2011	Kenny Chesney; Grace Potter; Shaun Silva	"You and Tequila"	Blake Shelton, Trey Fanjoy - "Honey Bee"; The Band Perry, David McClister - "If I Die Young"; Taylor Swift, Declan Whitebloom - "Mean"; Brad Paisley, Alabama, Jim Shea - "Old Alabama"
2010	Miranda Lambert; Trey Fanjoy	"The House That Built Me"	Blake Shelton, Trace Adkins, Roman White - "Hillbilly Bone"; Lady Antebellum, David McClister - "Need You Now"; Brad Paisley, Jim Shea - "Water"; Miranda Lambert, Chris Hicky - "White Liar"
2009	Taylor Swift; Trey Fanjoy	"Love Story"	Randy Houser, Eric Welch - "Boots On"; Billy Currington, The Brads - "People Are Crazy"; Brad Paisley, Keith Urban, Jim Shea - "Start a Band"; George Strait, Trey Fanjoy - "Troubadour"
2008	Brad Paisley; Andy Griffith; Jim Shea; Peter Tilden	"Waitin' on a Woman"	Kenny Chesney, Shaun Silva - "Don't Blink"; Alan Jackson, Trey Fanjoy - "Good Time"; Sugarland, Shaun Silva - "Stay"; Trace Adkins, Peter Zavadil - "You're Gonna Miss This"
2007	Brad Paisley; Jason Alexander	"Online"	Martina McBride, Robert Deaton, George Flanigen IV - "Anyway"; Carrie Underwood, Roman White - "Before He Cheats"; Emerson Drive, Steven Goldmann - "Moments"; Kenny Chesney, Shaun Silva - "You Save Me"
2006	Brooks & Dunn; Robert Deaton; George J. Flanigen IV	"Believe"	Big & Rich, Robert Deaton, George Flanigen IV, Marc Oswald - "8th of November"; Carrie Underwood, Roman White - "Jesus, Take the Wheel"; Miranda Lambert, Trey Fanjoy - "Kerosene"; Brad Paisley, Dolly Parton, Jim Shea - "When I Get Where I'm Going"
2005	Toby Keith; Michael Salomon	"As Good as I Once Was"	Brad Paisley, Jim Shea - "Alcohol"; Keith Urban, Wayne Isham - "Days Go By"; Lee Ann Womack, Trey Fanjoy - "I May Hate Myself in the Morning"; Gretchen Wilson, Robert Deaton, George Flanigen IV - "When I Think About Cheatin'"
2004	Brad Paisley; Alison Krauss; Ricky Schroder	"Whiskey Lullaby"	Toby Keith, Michael Salomon - "I Love This Bar"; Alan Jackson, Jimmy Buffett, Trey Fanjoy - "It's Five O'Clock Somewhere"; Gretchen Wilson, David Hogan - "Redneck Woman"; Alan Jackson, Trey Fanjoy - "Remember When"
2003	Johnny Cash; Mark Romanek	"Hurt"	Willie Nelson, Toby Keith, Michael Salomon - "Beer for My Horses"; Brad Paisley, Peter Zavadil - "Celebrity"; Martina McBride, Robert Deaton, George Flanigen IV - "Concrete Angel"; Brooks & Dunn, Steven Goldmann - "Red Dirt Road"
2002	Brad Paisley; Peter Zavadil	"I'm Gonna Miss Her (The Fishin' Song)"	Alan Jackson, Steven Goldmann - "Drive (For Daddy Gene)"; Toby Keith, Michael Salomon - "I Wanna Talk About Me"; Travis Tritt, Michael Merriman - "Modern Day Bonnie and Clyde"; Alan Jackson, Paul Miller - "Where Were You (When the World Stopped Turning)"
2001	Sara Evans; Peter Zavadil	"Born to Fly"	Lee Ann Womack, Greg Horne - "Ashes by Now"; Trisha Yearwood, Chris Rogers - "I Would've Loved You Anyway"; Jamie O'Neal, Lawrence Carroll - "There Is No Arizona"; Alan Jackson, Morgan Lawley - "www.memory"
2000	Dixie Chicks; Evan Bernard	"Goodbye Earl"	Faith Hill, Lili Zanuck - "Breathe"; Brad Paisley, Robert Deaton, George Flanigen IV - "He Didn't Have to Be"; Toby Keith, Michael Salomon - "How Do You Like Me Now?!"; Lee Ann Womack, Gary Wenner - "I Hope You Dance"
1999	Dixie Chicks; Thom Oliphant	"Wide Open Spaces"	Mark Wills, Jim Hershleder - "Don't Laugh at Me"; Kenny Chesney, Martin Kahan - "How Forever Feels"; Alan Jackson, Steven Goldmann - "I'll Go On Loving You"; Tim McGraw, Faith Hill, Jim Shea - "Just to Hear You Say That You Love Me"
1998	Faith Hill; Steven Goldmann	"This Kiss"	Martina McBride, Robert Deaton, George Flanigen IV - "A Broken Wing"; Jo Dee Messina, Jon Small - "Bye, Bye"; George Strait, Christopher Cain - "Carrying Your Love with Me"; Deana Carter, Roger Pistole - "Did I Shave My Legs for This?"
1997	Kathy Mattea; Steven Goldmann	"455 Rocket"	Pam Tillis, Steven Goldmann - "All the Good Ones Are Gone"; Trace Adkins, Michael Merriman - "Every Light in the House"; Tim McGraw, Faith Hill, Sherman Halsey - "It's Your Love"; Deana Carter, Roger Pistole - "Strawberry Wine"
1996	Junior Brown; Michael McNamara	"My Wife Thinks You're Dead"	George Strait, John Lloyd Miller - "Check Yes or No"; Vince Gill, John Lloyd Miller - "Go Rest High on That Mountain"; Brooks & Dunn, Michael Oblowitz - "My Maria"; Jeff Foxworthy, Alan Jackson, Coke Sams - "Redneck Games"
1995	The Tractors; Michael Salomon	"Baby Likes to Rock It"	Shania Twain, Charlie Randazzo - "Any Man of Mine"; Alan Jackson, Piers Plowden - "I Don't Even Know Your Name"; Garth Brooks, Jon Small - "The Red Strokes"; Vince Gill, John Lloyd Miller - "When Love Finds You"
1994	Martina McBride; Robert Deaton; George J. Flanigan IV	"Independence Day"	Reba McEntire, Linda Davis, Jon Small - "Does He Love You"; Little Texas, Gerry Wenner - "God Blessed Texas"; Patty Loveless, Jim Shea - "How Can I Help You Say Goodbye"; Garth Brooks, Jon Small - "Standing Outside the Fire"
1993	Alan Jackson; Martin Kahan	"Chattahoochee"	Pam Tillis, Michael Salomon - "Cleopatra, Queen of Denial"; Vince Gill, John Lloyd Miller - "Don't Let Our Love Start Slippin' Away"; George Jones, Marc Ball - "I Don't Need Your Rockin' Chair"; John Anderson, Jim Shea - "Seminole Wind"
1992	Alan Jackson; Jim Shea	"Midnight in Montgomery"	Billy Ray Cyrus, Marc Ball - "Achy Breaky Heart"; Travis Tritt, Jack Cole - "Anymore"; Reba McEntire, Jack Cole - "Is There Life Out There"; Vince Gill, John Lloyd Miller - "Look at Us"
1991	Garth Brooks; Bud Schaetzle	"The Thunder Rolls"	K. T. Oslin, Jack Cole - "Come Next Monday"; Alan Jackson, Julien Temple - "Don't Rock the Jukebox"; Reba McEntire, Jack Cole - "Fancy"; The Judds, Bud Schaetzle - "Love Can Build a Bridge"
1990	Garth Brooks; John Lloyd Miller	"The Dance"	Kentucky Headhunters, John Lloyd Miller - "Dumas Walker"; Randy Travis, Mark Coppos - "He Walked on Water"; Marty Stuart, Joanne Gardner - "Hillbilly Rock"; Kathy Mattea, Jim May - "Where've You Been"
1989	Hank Williams Jr. Hank Williams Sr. Ethan Russell	"There's a Tear in My Beer"	Rodney Crowell, Bill Pope - "After All This Time"; Lorrie Morgan, Steven Buck - "Dear Me"; Dolly Parton, Jack Cole - "Why'd You Come in Here Lookin' Like That"; Nitty Gritty Dirt Band, Bill Pope - "Will the Circle Be Unbroken: Volume II"
1988	Not Awarded		
1987	Hank Williams Jr.'; Bill Fishman	"My Name is Bocephus"	Michael Martin Murphey, Michael Merriman - "A Long Line of Love"; Randy Travis, Jack Cole - "Forever and Ever, Amen"; The O'Kanes, Bill Pope - "Oh Darlin'"; Reba McEntire, Jon Small - "What Am I Gonna Do About You"
1986	George Jones; Marc Ball	"Who's Gonna Fill Their Shoes"	Gary Morris, Ethan Russell - "100% Chance of Rain"; The Judds, David Hogan - "Grandpa (Tell Me 'Bout the Good Old Days)"; Dwight Yoakam, Sherman Halsey - "Honky Tonk Man"; Reba McEntire, Jon Small - "Whoever's in New England"
1985	Hank Williams Jr. John Goodhue	"All My Rowdy Friends Are Coming Over Tonight"	Waylon Jennings, David Hogan - "America"; Ricky Skaggs, Martin Kahan - "Country Boy"; The Highwaymen, Peter Israelson - "Highwayman"; Gary Morris, Mark Rezyka - "Second Hand Heart"

== Category facts ==
=== Artists ===
Artists with multiple wins

Rank	1st	2nd	3rd
Total wins	4 wins	3 wins	2 wins
Artist	Brad Paisley	Hank Williams Jr.	Garth Brooks; Kenny Chesney; Dixie Chicks; Alan Jackson; Toby Keith; Miranda Lambert; Taylor Swift; Ella Langley

Artists with multiple nominations

12 nominations

- Alan Jackson

11 nominations

- Brad Paisley

10 nominations

- Miranda Lambert

6 nominations

- Carrie Underwood
- Kenny Chesney
- Toby Keith

5 nominations

- Reba McEntire
- Taylor Swift

4 nominations

- Blake Shelton
- Dierks Bentley
- Faith Hill
- Garth Brooks
- Keith Urban
- Little Big Town
- Martina McBride
- Tim McGraw
- Vince Gill

3 nominations

- Brooks & Dunn
- Chris Stapleton
- Eric Church
- George Strait
- Hank Williams Jr.
- Kacey Musgraves
- Lady Antebellum
- Lee Ann Womack
- Maren Morris
- Trace Adkins

2 nominations

- Ashley McBryde
- Brothers Osborne
- Carly Pearce
- Dan + Shay
- Deana Carter
- Dixie Chicks
- Dolly Parton
- Gary Morris
- George Jones
- Gretchen Wilson
- Kathy Mattea
- Lainey Wilson
- Pam Tillis
- Randy Travis
- Sugarland
- The Judds
- Thomas Rhett
- Travis Tritt

=== Directors ===
Directors with multiple wins

Rank	1st	2nd	3rd
Total wins	3 wins	2 wins	
Artist	Trey Fanjoy; Michael Salomon	Robert Deaton; Wes Edwards; George J. Flanigan IV; Steven Goldmann; TK McKamy; Jim Shea; Peter Zavadil	

Directors with multiple nominations

18 nominations

- Trey Fanjoy

10 nominations

- Jim Shea

8 nominations

- Michael Salomon

7 nominations

- John Lloyd Miller
- Peter Zavadil
- Steven Goldmann

6 nominations

- Jack Cole
- Jon Small
- Wes Edwards

5 nominations

- Reid Long
- Shaun Silva

4 nominations

- TK McKamy

3 nominations

- Bill Pope
- David Hogan
- Marc Ball
- Martin Kahan
- Patrick Tracy
- Roman White
- Shane Drake

2 nominations

- Bud Schaetzle
- David McClister
- Declan Whitebloom
- Ethan Russell
- George J. Flanigan IV
- Justin Clough
- Michael Merriman
- Randee St. Nicholas
- Roger Pistole
- Sherman Halsey
