= Stoned Cold Country =

Compilation album by various artists
- Released: March 17, 2023
- Studio: Multiple studios, Nashville, Tennessee
- Length: 70:00
- Label: This Is Hit
- Producer: Robert Deaton; Danny Rader; Marcus King; Oscar Charles; Jay Joyce

Singles from Stoned Cold Country
- 1. "It's Only Rock 'n Roll (But I Like It)" Released: November 4, 2022; 2. "Sympathy for the Devil" Released: January 13, 2023; 3. "You Can't Always Get What You Want" Released: February 17, 2023; 4. "Miss You" Released: March 3, 2023

Stoned Cold Country is a tribute album to the Rolling Stones featuring covers performed by country music artists. It was released on March 17, 2023, by This Is Hit and was produced by Robert Deaton.

== Background ==
The album, made to celebrate the Stones' 60th anniversary as a band, will feature country artists such as Eric Church, Maren Morris, and Ashley McBryde, covering the band's songs. The project was helmed and produced by Robert Deaton, who called the album "country music's thank you to the Rolling Stones for 60 years of inspiration and providing the soundtrack of our lives." Deaton said the album, and his country music-centered career, were partly inspired by the Stones, explaining that he heard Ronnie Milsap live cover of "Honky Tonk Women" from 1976 and believed it to be "one of the greatest country music songs of all time."

The lead single, Brothers Osborne and the War and Treaty's rendition of "It's Only Rock 'n Roll (But I Like It)", released November 4. The second single, Elvie Shane's cover of "Sympathy for the Devil", was released January 13. Lainey Wilson's version of "You Can't Always Get What You Want" was released as the third single on February 17. The fourth single, Jimmie Allen's version of "Miss You", was released on March 3, 2023.

== Production ==
Per BMG Rights Management CEO Hartwig Masuch, Deaton sold him on the album over "three bottles of white wine" at a dinner in Los Angeles. BMG own the publishing rights to Mick Jagger and Keith Richards' songwriting. Deaton confirmed that Jagger and Richards gave their blessing to the project personally, though it wasn't needed. With that, he began the process of selecting artists. He listened to the Stones' songs "over and over, 100 times" so he good decide which songs to pair with which artists, with Masuch setting no rules on who he chose or how many had to be BMG signees. Only three BMG artists – Elvie Shane, Lainey Wilson, and Jimmie Allen – made the cut. Deaton allowed Zac Brown to choose "Paint It Black" for his band to record. All musicians recorded live without click tracks. The songs were recorded in various Nashville-area studios.

== Promotion ==
The War and Treaty and the Brothers Osborne performed their "It's Only Rock 'n Roll" cover together at the 2022 CMA Awards, with the show's co-host Luke Bryan introducing the performance and album.

== Style ==
The album is said not to make pure country out of the Stones' catalogue, but to bring together country artists who have a rock and roll bent and have them stay close to the original songs, just with added steel guitar.

== Reception ==
Stoned Cold Country ratings
Aggregate scores
Source	Rating
Metacritic	60/100
Review scores
Source	Rating
Mojo	4/5 stars
PopMatters	3/10
Uncut	2.5/5 stars

According to the review aggregator Metacritic, Stoned Cold Country received "mixed or average reviews" based on a weighted average score of 60 out of 100 from 4 critic scores.

Variety's Chris Willman wrote that not all fourteen songs pay off, but "highlights abound" including Church, Wilson, Little Big Town, and blues rock musician Marcus King.

== Track listing ==
All tracks are written by Jagger/Richards.

Stoned Cold Country track listing
No.	Title	Artists	Length
1.	"(I Can't Get No) Satisfaction"	Ashley McBryde	4:30
2.	"Honky Tonk Women"	Brooks & Dunn	3:29
3.	"Dead Flowers"	Maren Morris	4:17
4.	"It's Only Rock 'n Roll (But I Like It)"	Brothers Osborne and the War and Treaty	5:22
5.	"Miss You"	Jimmie Allen	4:54
6.	"Tumbling Dice"	Elle King	3:39
7.	"Can't You Hear Me Knocking"	Marcus King	5:17
8.	"Wild Horses"	Little Big Town	6:11
9.	"Paint It Black"	Zac Brown Band	4:11
10.	"You Can't Always Get What You Want"	Lainey Wilson	7:13
11.	"Sympathy for the Devil"	Elvie Shane	6:11
12.	"Angie"	Steve Earle	5:03
13.	"Gimme Shelter"	Eric Church	4:09
14.	"Shine a Light"	Koe Wetzel	5:26
Total length:			70:00

== Personnel ==
=== Musicians ===
"(I Can't Get No) Satisfaction"

- Chris Harris – acoustic guitar
- Danny Rader – electric guitar, Hammond B3 organ
- Matt Helmkamp – electric guitar
- Christian Sancho – bass
- Quinn Hill – drums
- Maureen Murphy and Nickie Conley – backing vocals

"Honky Tonk Women"

- Kix Brooks and Ronnie Dunn – lead vocals
- Danny Rader – acoustic guitar
- Kenny Greenberg and Rob McNelley – electric guitar
- Michael Rhodes – bass
- Miles McPherson – drums
- Gary Morse – steel guitar
- Maureen Murphy and Nickie Conley – backing vocals

"Dead Flowers"

- Danny Rader – acoustic guitar, backing vocals
- Steve Mackey – bass
- Greg Morrow – drums
- Rob McNelley – electric guitar
- Mike Rojas – Hammond B3 organ, piano
- Mike Johnson – steel guitar

"It's Only Rock 'n Roll (But I Like It)"

- John Osborne and Kenny Greenberg – electric guitar
- Danny Rader – acoustic guitar
- Michael Rhodes – bass
- Greg Morrow – drums
- Mike Rojas – keyboards
- Sam Levine – baritone saxophone, tenor saxophone
- Roy Agee – trombone
- Mike Haynes – trumpet

"Miss You"

- Danny Rader – acoustic guitar
- Kenny Greenberg – electric guitar
- Michael Rhodes – bass
- Greg Morrow – drums
- Mike Rojas – keyboards
- Mickey Raphael – harmonica
- Maureen Murphy and Nickie Conley – backing vocals

"Tumbling Dice"

- Adam Shoenfeld and Jerry McPherson – electric guitar
- Michael Rhodes – bass
- Evan Hutchings – drums
- Mike Rojas – Hammond B3 organ, piano
- Dan Dugmore – steel guitar
- Maureen Murphy and Nickie Conley – backing vocals

"Can't You Hear Me Knocking"

- Marcus King – lead vocals, electric guitar
- Drew Smithers – electric guitar
- Stephen Campbell – bass
- Jack Ryan – drums
- Mike Runyon – keyboards
- Christopher Spies – saxophone
- Justin Johnson – trumpet, trombone, tambourine, shaker
- Maureen Murphy and Nickie Conley – backing vocals

"Wild Horses"

- Jimi Westbrook, Karen Fairchild, Kimberly Schlapman, and Philip Sweet – vocals
- Kris Donegan – acoustic guitar
- Rob McNelley – electric guitar
- Eli Beaird – bass
- Evan Hutchings – drums
- Akil Thompson – Hammond B3 organ, piano
- Paul Franklin – steel guitar

"Paint It Black"

- Zac Brown – lead vocals, nylon-string guitar
- Coy Bowles – electric guitar
- John Hopkins – electric guitar, backing vocals
- Matt Mangano – bass
- Chris Fryar – drums
- Caroline Jones – bouzouki, backing vocals
- Clay Cook – Hammond B3 organ, piano, backing vocals
- Daniel de los Reyes – percussion
- Jimmy de Martini – violin, backing vocals
- Paul Franklin – steel guitar

"You Can't Always Get What You Want"

- Danny Rader – acoustic guitar
- Rob McNelley – electric guitar
- Steve Mackey – bass
- Greg Morrow – drums
- Mike Rojas – keyboards
- Dan Dugmore – steel guitar
- Maureen Murphy, Nickie Conley, and Nikki Conley – backing vocals

"Sympathy for the Devil"

- Danny Rader – acoustic guitar
- Sam Levine – baritone saxophone, tenor saxophone
- Rob McNelley and Tom Bukovac – electric guitar
- Steve Mackey – bass
- Gordon Mote – Hammond B3 organ, piano
- Glen Caruba and Oscar Charles – percussion
- Roy Agee – trombone
- Mike Haynes – trumpet

"Angie"

- Caleb Miller – acoustic guitar
- Michael Rhodes – bass
- Chris Deaton – drums
- Mike Rojas – keyboards
- Paul Franklin – steel guitar
- Ilya Toshinskiy – mandolin
- Jenee Fleenor – fiddle

"Gimme Shelter"

- Eric Church and Joanna Cotten – vocals
- Jay Joyce – acoustic guitar, keyboards, percussion
- Driver Williams and Jeff Hyde – acoustic guitar
- Jeff Cease and Rob McNelley – electric guitar
- Lee Hendricks – bass
- Craig Wright – drums
- Billy Justineau – keyboards

"Shine a Light"

- Danny Rader – acoustic guitar
- Kenny Greenberg – electric guitar
- Michael Rhodes – bass
- Nick Buda – drums
- Gordon Mote – Hammond B3 organ
- Chuck Leavell – piano
- Jimmy Bowland – baritone saxophone, tenor saxophone
- Jeff Coffin – tenor saxophone
- Ray Mason – trombone
- Mike Haynes and Tyler Jaeger – trumpet
- April Rucker, Devonne Fowlkes, Kristen Rogers, and Maureen Murphy – backing vocals

=== Technical ===
- Robert Deaton – producer
- Danny Rader – producer
- Marcus King – producer (7)
- Oscar Charles – producer (11)
- Jay Joyce – producer (13)
- Mike "Frog" Griffith – project coordinator
- Court Blankenship – project coordinator (13)
- Sam Levine – arranger (4, 5, 11)
- David Hamilton – arranger, conductor (14)
- Dan Davis, Evan Wilber, Hank Bachara, Pete Lyman, Michael Walter, Jordan Reed, Brandon Towles, Michelle Freetly, Reid Shippen, Austin Brown, Steve Marcantonio, Jason Hall, Jay Joyce, Jimmy Mansfield, Josh Groppel, Joel McKenney – engineers

== Charts ==
Chart performance for Stoned Cold Country
Chart (2023)	Peak position
UK Album Downloads (OCC)	37
