= Passion =

Passion, passions, the Passion or the Passions most often refers to:

- Passion (emotion), a very strong feeling about a person or thing

Passion, passions, the Passion or the Passions may also refer to:

== Philosophy and religion ==
- Passion of Jesus, the suffering of Jesus leading up to and during the crucifixion
  - Passion (music), musical setting of the texts describing these events
  - Passion Play, dramatic representation of these events
  - Passion Sunday, the second Sunday before Easter
  - Passion Conferences, Christian organization
- Passions (philosophy), emotional states as used in philosophical discussions
- Stoic passions, various forms of emotional suffering in Stoicism

== Arts and entertainment ==
=== Books ===
- "The Passion" (Milton), 17th-century poem by John Milton
- The Passions an 18th-century poem by William Collins
- The Passions (novel), 1811, by Charlotte Dacre
- Passion, (in Italian, Fosca), 1869 novel by Iginio Ugo Tarchetti
- Passion Play (play) or Passion, 1981 play by Peter Nichols
- Passion: An Essay on Personality, 1984 book by Roberto Unger
- The Passion (novel), 1987, by Jeanette Winterson
- Passion (manga), 2004 Japanese yaoi manga series
- Passion (novel), 2011 young adult fantasy novel by Lauren Kate

=== Film ===
- Passion (1919 film), US title for Ernst Lubitsch's silent film Madame Dubarry
- Passion (1925 film), directed by Richard Eichberg
- Passion (1932 film), directed by Hiroshi Shimizu
- Passion (1940 film), a German drama
- Passion (1951 film), a French drama directed by Georges Lampin
- Passion (1954 film), American film directed by Allan Dwan
- En passion or The Passion of Anna, 1969, written and directed by Ingmar Bergman
- Passion (1982 film), directed by Jean-Luc Godard
- Passions (1984 film), starring Lindsay Wagner
- Passion (1986 film), a Hong Kong film directed by and starring Sylvia Chang
- Passions (1994 film), directed by Kira Muratova
- Passion (1996 film), a filmed staging of the original Broadway cast of the musical by Stephen Sondheim and James Lapine
- Ishq (1997 film), or Passion, a 1997 Indian film by Indra Kumar
- Passion (1998 film), directed by György Fehér
- Passion (1999 film), about pianist and composer Percy Grainger
- The Passion of the Christ, 2004 film directed by Mel Gibson
- Passion (2005 film), by director Mohammad Malas
- Passion (2009 film), a Turkish LGBT film by Emre Yalgı
- Passion (2012 film), by Brian De Palma

=== Television ===
- "Passion" (Buffy the Vampire Slayer), 1998 episode of the fantasy-horror series
- The Passion (TV series), 1999 British TV drama series about an amateur production of a passion play
- Passions (TV series), 1999–2008 American soap opera
- Pasión (TV series), 2007–2008, period Mexican telenovela
- The Passion (TV serial), 2008 British serial about the last days of Christ
- "Passion" (Law & Order: Criminal Intent), 2009 episode of the American police procedural
- The Passion (franchise), a huge passion play, held around Easter on the streets of a particular city, initially Netherlands
  - The Passion (Netherlands), a Dutch adaptation that has aired yearly since 2011
  - The Passion: New Orleans, an American 2016 TV special adaptation held in New Orleans

=== Theatre ===
- Passion (musical), 1994, by Stephen Sondheim and James Lapine
  - Passion (original Broadway cast recording), 1994 album containing a recording of the musical made by its original Broadway cast

=== Music ===
==== Classical compositions ====
- Passions (Bach), five settings of the Passion by Johann Sebastian Bach
  - St John Passion, a 1724 setting of the Passion by J. S. Bach
  - St Matthew Passion, 1727 setting of the Passion by Johann Sebastian Bach
- Passions (C. P. E. Bach), 21 settings of the Passion by C.P.E. Bach
- The Passion (Haydn) or Symphony No. 49, by Joseph Haydn
- The Passions, by William Hayes
- Passions (Telemann), series of compositions by Georg Philipp Telemann

==== Bands and performers ====
- Passion (New York band), short-lived disco and post-disco music band
- Passion (worship band), related to Passion Conferences
- Passion (rapper), former rapper from Oakland, California
- The Passions (American band), 1960s
- The Passions (British band), 1978–1983

==== Albums ====
- Passion (Robin Trower album), 1986
- Passion (Jennifer Rush album), 1988
- Passion (Peter Gabriel album), 1989
- Passion – Sources, by Peter Gabriel, 1989
- Passion (Steve Laury album), 1991
- Passion (Regina Belle album), 1993
- Passion (Sammi Cheng album), 1996
- Passion (Lady Saw album), 1997
- Passion (Murray Head album), 2002
- Passion (J. C. Schütz album), 2004
- Passion (Lee Jung-hyun album), 2004
- Passion (Geri Halliwell album), 2005
- Passion (Kreesha Turner album), 2008
- Passion (In-Grid album), 2010
- Passion (Anaal Nathrakh album), 2011
- Passion (Pendragon album), 2011
- Pasión (Roberto Alagna album), 2011
- Passione (Andrea Bocelli album), 2013
- The Passions (album), by Les Baxter featuring Bas Sheva

==== Songs ====
- "Passion" (Gat Decor song), 1992
- "Passion" (Rod Stewart song), 1980
- "Passion" (The Flirts song), 1982
- "Passion" (Hikaru Utada song), 2005
- "P.A.S.S.I.O.N." (song), by Rythm Syndicate, 1991
- "Pasión" (song), by Sarah Brightman and Fernando Lima, 2008
- "La Passion", by Gigi D'Agostino, 1999
- "Passion" (PinkPantheress song), 2021
- "Passion", by Amen! UK, 1995
- "Passion", by Andrea and Otilia featuring Shaggy, 2015
- "Passion", by 1 Giant Leap from 1 Giant Leap, 2002
- "The Passion", by Jaden Smith from Syre, 2017
- "The Passions", by Owen Pallett from In Conflict, 2014
- "Passion", by All That Remains from This Darkened Heart, 2004

==== Radio stations ====
- Passion 107.9, former name for a radio station in Oxfordshire, England, now called Hits Radio Oxfordshire
- Passion Radio, radio station in Sussex, England

== Other uses ==
- Passion fruit
- Passion Richardson (born 1975), American former sprint athlete
- The Nexus One, an Android smartphone developed by HTC and Google, codename passion
- Hero Passion, a motorcycle produced by Hero MotoCorp of India
- Voyah Passion, a Chinese battery electric full-size sedan

== See also ==
- Pasion, ancient Greek slave and banker
- Pasyon, 1852 Filipino narrative of the passion of Christ
- Passione (disambiguation)
- Pasiones (disambiguation)
