= Who We Are (Lifehouse album) =

Studio album by Lifehouse
- Released: June 18, 2007
- Recorded: 2006–2007
- Genres: Alternative rock; pop rock; post-grunge
- Length: 46:20
- Label: Geffen
- Producers: Jude Cole; Lifehouse; John Fields

Lifehouse chronology
Lifehouse (2005)	Who We Are (2007)	Smoke & Mirrors (2010)

Singles from Who We Are
- 1. "First Time" Released: May 7, 2007; 2. "Whatever It Takes" Released: November 13, 2007; 3. "Broken" Released: July 8, 2008

Who We Are is the fourth studio album by American alternative rock band Lifehouse. It was first released via compact disc in the United States on June 18, 2007 by Geffen Records. It was released via digital download the next day on June 19, 2007. The band entered the studio without any demos recorded and only had lyrics from Lifehouse lead singer Jason Wade.

The album received positive reviews from critics, and peaked at number fourteen on the Billboard 200, selling 49,000 copies in its first week. It also managed to chart in the top twenty of Billboard's Alternative Albums, Digital Albums, and Rock Albums charts the first week it was released. It was certified Gold in the United States by the RIAA on October 22, 2008.

The album's lead single, "First Time", was released May 7, 2007, and charted in several countries. The second single, "Whatever It Takes", was released on November 13, 2007, and charted on several Billboard charts. The third single, "Broken" was released January 8, 2008, and had commercial success in the United States and Canada, and eventually other countries.

== Background ==
As a follow-up to the success of their previous eponymous album, band manager Jude Cole was granted wider creative control. Who We Are was once more executive produced by Cole, who brought along fellow producer John Fields and Lifehouse themselves as co-producers. The band started recording the album without any demos, and only had lyrics from Jason Wade when they entered the studio. When asked about creating a song for the album, Lifehouse lead percussionist Rick Woolstenhulme, Jr. said, "Nobody really knew what they would be playing. We just cut it, listened to it and realized it was pretty electric… the kind of song where you just turn up the radio." The album focused on the different emotions of love, bliss, struggles, and pain. Musically, the album was a combination of rock, alternative, and adult alternative. After being asked about the title of the album, Wade stated, "We established camaraderie on the road and gelled as a unit. This record defines 'Who We Are,' which is why that’s the title. The sound fits where we’re at right now."

Lifehouse lead singer Jason Wade had many inspirations when writing songs for Who We Are. When asked about the background of lead single "First Time", Wade said, "It just felt urgent, like a first kiss, a first love. Like the first time you realize there's more to that relationship than you thought. I had to dig a little for that one, but I find myself at a place where I can write stuff that's a little deeper than your average love song in terms of emotion." Wade was inspired to write "The Joke" after he read a newspaper article that detailed the story of a British boy who hanged himself as a result of being bullied by his fellow schoolmates. The song "Broken" was written by Wade after he visited a friend in Nashville that needed a kidney transplant.

"Make Me Over" was inspired by the band's love of British rock, while strains of "Learn You Inside Out" were inspired by the Plastic Ono Band. When asked about the song "Learn You Inside Out", Wade said, "I wrote it really quick. We decided just to freestyle. It was one of those moments when we really grew as a band, being able to reach each other and know where we're going." The song "Disarray" was inspired by Wade's strict and religious family. When asked about the song, he said, "Angels, demons. We all fight them both, and anyone who pretends they don’t is not someone I want to hang out with." "Storm" was originally written by Wade at the age of sixteen, when he was going through difficult times. When asked about the song in an interview, Wade said, "That was fun to record because of its starkness. We love the idea of the title, surrounded by negative space, like the a cappella beginning. Because when you’re lost in confusion, no matter how much is going on around you, you’re still alone."

=== Singles ===
"First Time" was released as the album's lead single on May 7, 2007 and was solicited to mainstream radio on May 15, 2007. The song peaked at number twenty-six on the Billboard Hot 100 and at number forty-seven on the Canadian Hot 100. It also appeared on the Billboard Mainstream Top 40, Hot 100 Airplay, Digital Songs, and Adult Contemporary charts. In 2007, the song was nominated for the "Choice Music: Love Song" award at the Teen Choice Awards. "Whatever It Takes" was released as the album's second single on November 13, 2007. The song peaked at number thirty-three on the Billboard Hot 100 during its twenty weeks on the chart. It also placed on the Billboard Pop Songs, Radio Songs, Digital Songs, Adult Contemporary, and Christian Songs charts. "Broken" was released as the album's third and final single on July 8, 2008. It appeared on the Billboard Hot 100, Canadian Hot 100, and Digital Songs charts. On October 10, 2007, "Broken" was played in the Criminal Minds episode "Scared to Death". Several months later, the song appeared in the Grey's Anatomy episode "Lay Your Hands On Me" on January 10, 2008. It featured in the One Tree Hill episode "For Tonight You're Only Here to Know" on February 26, 2008.

== Reception ==
=== Critical reception ===
Professional ratings
Review scores
Source	Rating
Allmusic	2.5/5 stars
Contact Music	(positive)
Jesus Freak Hideout	4/5 stars
Melodic.net	4/5 stars
Slant Magazine	1.5/5 stars

Stephen Thomas Erlewine of Allmusic described the album as "post-alternative guitar rock preserved in amber, all shallow angst and earnestness, communicated through music that surges without hooks." However, he further commented that "Lifehouse [is] pleasant enough, but hardly memorable, and hardly [answers] the question of who they are no matter how they try." Alex Lai of Contact Music called "the ballads on this record amongst the best the band has produced" and further commented that "[the album] is very well balanced and though far from groundbreaking, show that Lifehouse have returned to their consistent best." John DiBiase of Jesus Freak Hideout said that the album "isn't much different from their previous chapters." However, DiBiase said that "there [are] plenty of accented new flavors among the tracks to keep things fresh and interesting."

=== Chart performance ===
In the United States, Who We Are debuted and peaked at number fourteen on the Billboard Hot 200, selling 49,000 copies in its first week. It stayed on the chart for seventy-six non-consecutive weeks. The album debuted and peaked on the Billboard Rock Albums chart at number five. On the Billboard Digital Albums chart, the album debuted and peaked at number four and stayed on the chart for five consecutive weeks. It debuted and peaked at number eighteen on the Billboard Alternative Albums chart and stayed there for ten non-consecutive weeks. It was certified Gold in the United States by the RIAA on October 22, 2008. As of June 28, 2010, the album's singles have garnered over three million digital downloads.

== Promotion ==
In support of Who We Are, Lifehouse went on the "Disarray Tour", which was highlighted by dates in Los Angeles, Chicago, New York City, and Atlanta. American singer-songwriter Matt Nathanson and HoneyHoney joined Lifehouse on select dates throughout the tour. Lifehouse continued to promote the album on Last Call with Carson Daly on July 9, 2007 where they played "First Time". They also performed the song on The Late Late Show with Craig Ferguson on August 15, 2007. The band made an appearance at the 2008 NFL Pro Bowl on February 10, 2008. On February 15, 2008, the band performed on The Tonight Show with Jay Leno. They performed on Live with Regis and Kelly playing "First Time" and "Whatever It Takes" on April 1, 2008.

== Track listing ==
All songs produced by Jude Cole and Lifehouse, except "Broken" produced by John Fields.

Standard edition
No.	Title	Writer(s)	Length
1.	"Disarray"	Jason Wade	3:45
2.	"First Time"	Wade; Jude Cole	3:23
3.	"Whatever It Takes"	Wade; Cole	3:27
4.	"Who We Are"	Wade; Cole	3:27
5.	"Broken"	Wade	4:46
6.	"The Joke"	Wade; Cole; Rick Woolstenhulme, Jr.	3:56
7.	"Easier to Be"	Wade; Cole	3:31
8.	"Make Me Over"	Wade; Cole	3:57
9.	"Mesmerized"	Wade; Cole	3:13
10.	"Bridges"	Wade	4:02
11.	"Learn You Inside-Out"	Wade	4:26
12.	"Storm"	Wade	4:25
Total length:			37:47

iTunes Deluxe Version
No.	Title	Length
13.	"If This is Goodbye"	2:55

Wal-Mart Exclusive Edition
No.	Title	Length
14.	"Signs of Life"	5:18

Target Exclusive Edition
No.	Title	Length
15.	"I Want You to Know"	3:21

Best Buy Exclusive Edition
No.	Title	Length
16.	"Keep the Change"	4:22

Expanded Edition
No.	Title	Length
13.	"Keep the Change"	4:22
14.	"You and Me (live in Portland)"	3:29
15.	"Hanging by a Moment (acoustic)"	3:18
16.	"Come Back Down (live in Portland)"	4:48
17.	"I Want You to Know"	3:25
18.	"Signs of Life"	5:17
19.	"If This is Goodbye"	2:55
20.	"You and Me (extended wedding song version)"	5:17

== Credits and personnel ==
Adapted from Allmusic.

- Jason Wade – composer, group member, guitar, piano, vocals
- Bryce Soderberg – bass, group member, background vocals
- Rick Woolstenhulme Jr. drums, group member
- German Villacorta – assistant
- Mark Somgynari – assistant
- Will Sandalls – engineer
- Jeff Rothschild – mixing
- Jack Joseph Puig – mixing
- Evan Peters – A&R
- Thom Panunzio – A&R, mixing
- Dean Nelson – mixing assistant
- Tim McCloy – assistant
- Stephen Lu – conductor, string arrangements
- Chris Lord-Alge – mixing
- Pamela Littky – photography
- Lifehouse – producer
- Pat Leonard – keyboards
- Jenn Johnson – production coordination
- Erik Johnson – design
- Ted Jensen – mastering
- Ross Hogarth – engineering
- Tina Hagio – design
- Kunio Hagio – paintings
- Eric Gorfain – violin
- Mark Goldenberg – guitar
- John Fields – producer
- Scott Faircloff – engineering, vocal producer
- Richard Dodd – cello
- Rocco Deluca – organ
- Jude Cole – composer, guitar, keyboards, piano, producer, background vocals
- Daphne Chen – violin
- Leah Katz – viola
- Keith Armstrong – mixing assistant
- Florian Ammon – engineering, mixing
- Thom Panunzio – mixing, A&R
- Jeff Rothschild – mixing

== Charts ==
=== Weekly charts ===
Chart (2007)	Peak position
Japanese Albums Chart	185
US Billboard 200	14
US Top Alternative Albums (Billboard)	18
US Digital Albums (Billboard)	4
US Top Rock Albums (Billboard)	5

=== Year-end charts ===
Chart (2008)	Position
US Billboard 200	144

== Certifications ==
Region	Certification	Certified units/sales
United States (RIAA)	Gold	500,000^{^}
^{^} Shipments figures based on certification alone.

== Release history ==
Region	Date	Format	Label	Edition(s)
United States	June 18, 2007	CD	Geffen	Standard
United States	June 19, 2007	Digital download	Geffen	Standard
United Kingdom	June 24, 2007	CD	Import Music Services	Standard
Germany	July 3, 2007	CD	Geffen	Standard
Worldwide	August 25, 2007	Digital download	Geffen	Bonus tracks version
France	September 4, 2007	CD	Pid	Standard
Worldwide	July 22, 2008	CD	Geffen	Bonus CD version, Bonus tracks version
