= Masuch =

Masuch is a surname. Notable people with the surname include:

- Bettina Masuch (born 1964, German dramaturg and theatre director
- Daniel Masuch (born 1977), German footballer
- Hartwig Masuch (born 1954), German music executive
