= First Time (Lifehouse song) =

2007 single by Lifehouse

Single by Lifehouse

from the album Who We Are
- Released: May 7, 2007
- Genre: Power pop; alternative rock
- Length: 3:22
- Label: Geffen
- Songwriters: Jason Wade; Jude Cole
- Producer: Jude Cole

Lifehouse singles chronology
"Blind" (2005)	"First Time" (2007)	"Whatever It Takes" (2007)

"First Time" is a song by American alternative band Lifehouse and it is the first single released from their fourth studio album, Who We Are (2007). The song was written by lead singer Jason Wade alongside Jude Cole, who produced the song. Wade felt it was urgent to write the track and said that he had to think deep to write it. Musically, "First Time" is a power pop song that contains alternative rock with a theme about the early stages of romance. The track was first released as a digital download on May 7, 2007, by Geffen Records. It was then solicited to mainstream radio on May 15, 2007.

The song received positive reviews from critics who compared it to Lifehouse's "Hanging by a Moment". It charted at number 26 and number 47 respectively in the United States and Canada, and later charted in New Zealand at number 31. The song's music video premiered on AOLmusic.com and The N on June 29, 2007. It features clips of real couples falling in love for the first time. Lifehouse has performed the song live on late-night national television shows.

== Background and release ==
The song was written by Lifehouse lead singer Jason Wade and American record producer Jude Cole, who also produced the song. When asked about writing "First Time", Wade said, "It just felt urgent, like a first kiss, a first love. Like the first time you realize there's more to that relationship than you thought. I had to dig a little for that one, but I find myself at a place where I can write stuff that’s a little deeper than your average love song in terms of emotion." In September 2006, Lifehouse started writing songs in the studio for Who We Are, and recorded most of the songs the day they were written at Coles' Ironworks Studios in Los Angeles. Wade explained the process of recording the songs, and said, "There was something amazing in just diving right into capturing the moment without even creating a demo first." He further noted how he appreciated recording songs with many takes to capture the initial thought of a song. The track was released via digital download on May 7, 2007, by Geffen Records. It was then solicited to mainstream radio on May 15, 2007.

== Composition ==
"This time around it was about not having any preconceived notions. It was about letting the tape machine roll and getting the music down spontaneously. I'm at a place where it doesn't matter to me what other people think. I'm comfortable being myself. I'm writing from an honest place, not thinking about who's going to hear it, what they’re going to think or how they're going to interpret it. The lyrics can’t be contrived. They have to hit you right in the heart."

—Wade talking about his experience on writing songs for Who We Are.

"First Time"
"First Time" is composed in the key of E♭ major and sounds like "'Hanging by a Moment' meets 'Spin' with more of a distinct romantic angle like 'You and Me'".

"First Time" is a power pop song that contains alternative rock and pop punk influences. It was described as a "radio-friendly number with hooks aplenty" by Alex Lai of Contactmusic.com. John DiBiase of Jesus Freak Hideout described the song as "an upbeat love song", and further described it as "sort of a 'Hanging by a Moment' meets 'Spin' with more of a distinct romantic angle like 'You and Me.'" Billboard described the song as a "melodic ember-turner, balancing polished instrumentation and a crystal-clear hook against lead Jason Wade's sandy vocals." Sputnikmusic described the song as "a very quick paced song with a catchy rhythm that can compete with 'Hanging by a Moment' but just can't quite beat it." Steve Morley of UMC.org described the song as a "propulsive pop-rocker" that he said "move[d] beyond typical love song clichés." The song is set in common time with a tempo of 126 beats per minute. It is composed in the key of E♭ major, and Wade's vocal range spans from the low-note of E♭_{4} to the high-note of B♭_{5}. The song has a basic chord progression of A_{2}–B_{sus}–C♯_{m7}–B/D♯–E_{5}.

The theme of "First Time" is about the early stages of romance and specifically takes a look back at the butterflies and excitement of the initial rush of romance. The lyrics "Looking at you / Holding my breath / For once in my life / I'm scared to death / I'm taking a chance / Letting you inside" refer to how mature love requires vulnerability, sacrifice and effort, which is a responsibility that distinguishes serious commitment from youthful romantic discovery.

== Chart performance ==
"First Time" debuted at number 83 on the Billboard Hot 100. It moved around the chart for several months and eventually peaked at number 26. The song debuted at number 39 on the Billboard Pop Songs chart. It peaked at number 16 after being on the chart for 20 consecutive weeks. On the Billboard Radio Songs chart, the song debuted at number 71. It eventually peaked at number 36 on the chart. On the Billboard Adult Contemporary chart, it debuted at number 29 and eventually peaked at number 17 after being on the chart for 20 non-consecutive weeks. The song also charted on Billboard's Digital Songs chart and peaked at number 23.

"First Time" also charted internationally. It debuted on the Canadian Hot 100 at number 79. It stayed on the chart for 16 consecutive weeks until peaking at number 47 on the chart. It debuted on the New Zealand Singles Chart at number 31 for the week of July 30, 2007. That later became its peak after it spent seven consecutive weeks on the chart.

== Music video ==
The changing vibrant color occurs in the background as the song's intensity grows.

The music video premiered on AOLmusic.com and The N on June 29, 2007. It was also released on iTunes that same day. The music video, directed by Sean Mullins, was shot in Los Angeles and features real couples falling in love for the first time.

It begins with a shot of the band in a white room wearing all white clothes and playing all white instruments. As the energy of the song gets stronger, the white room and the band's clothing changes from white to a ruby red. According to Monsters and Critics, the vibrant colors in the music video show how passion explodes inside of people when they are in love for the first time. One couple gets tattoos for the first time, while another guy is seen teaching his girlfriend how to skateboard. After that, another couple is seen falling in love on a beach and a real life husband and wife embrace after the husband returns from the military.

== Promotion ==
The band performed the song in the 81st Macy's Thanksgiving Day Parade in 2007. Then in January 2008, Lifehouse performed the song as part of a set list on the PBS show Soundstage. The band then made an appearance at the 2008 NFL Pro Bowl halftime show on February 10, 2008, and performed "Hanging by a Moment" and "First Time". Lifehouse performed "First Time" on Live Sets, Last Call with Carson Daly, The Late Late Show with Craig Ferguson, The Tonight Show with Jay Leno, and Live with Regis and Kelly. The song was also used in a commercial to promote the 2008 Dodge Ram.

== Credits and personnel ==
Credits are adapted from Allmusic.

- Vocals – Jason Wade
- Background vocals – Bryce Soderburg, Jude Cole
- Songwriting – Jason Wade, Jude Cole
- Guitar – Jason Wade, Jude Cole
- Production – Jason Wade, Jude Cole, John Fields
- Mixing – Thom Panunzio, Jack Joseph Puig, Florian Ammon, Keith Armstrong, Dean Nelson, Jeff Rothschild
- Engineering – Florian Ammon, Scott Faircloff, Ross Hogarth, Will Sandalls

== Charts ==
=== Weekly charts ===
Chart (2007)	Peak position
Australia (ARIA)	78
Canada (Canadian Hot 100)	47
New Zealand (Recorded Music NZ)	31
US Billboard Hot 100	26
US Adult Pop Airplay (Billboard)	3
US Adult Contemporary (Billboard)	17
US Pop Airplay (Billboard)	16

=== Year-end charts ===
Chart (2007)	Position
US Billboard Hot 100	86
US Adult Top 40 (Billboard)	8
