= Whatever It Takes (Lifehouse song) =

2007 single by Lifehouse

Single by Lifehouse

from the album Who We Are
- Released: November 13, 2007
- Genre: Pop rock; adult alternative
- Length: 3:27
- Label: Geffen
- Songwriters: Jason Wade; Jude Cole

Lifehouse singles chronology
"First Time" (2007)	"Whatever It Takes" (2007)	"Broken" (2008)

"Whatever It Takes" is a song by the American alternative band Lifehouse. It is the second single released from their fourth studio album, Who We Are (2007). The song was written by Lifehouse lead singer Jason Wade and American record producer Jude Cole. When discussing the song, Wade felt that the message of the song dealt with how difficult it could be to be in a relationship. It was first released with the band's fourth studio album Who We Are on June 18, 2007 and was then solicited to mainstream radio on November 13, 2007. It is a moderately slow pop-rock ballad that has influences of adult alternative.

"Whatever It Takes" received positive reviews from critics who commended the song's chorus. It was a commercial success in the United States and charted in the top 40 on several charts in the country. The song's music video premiered on Yahoo! Music on November 15, 2007 and solely features Lifehouse lead singer Jason Wade and has the use of pyrotechnics throughout the video.

== Background and release ==
The song was written by Lifehouse lead singer Jason Wade and American record producer Jude Cole and was produced by Lifehouse and Jude Cole at Ironworks Studio in Los Angeles. In an interview with The San Bernardino Sun, Wade talked about making songs on the album and said, "This time around it was not about having any preconceived notions. It was about letting the tape machine roll and getting the music down spontaneously." When asked about the message of the song, Wade said, "I think the main message of this song, at least for me personally when I was writing the lyrics, is just how difficult it can be to be in a relationship. Sometimes, you do things to disappoint the other person. Letting someone down and trying to repair a relationship that you feel is kind of slipping through your hands a bit." "Whatever It Takes" was originally released with the band's fourth studio album, Who We Are, on June 18, 2007 and was officially solicited as a single to mainstream radio on November 13, 2007.

== Composition and critical reception ==
"Whatever It Takes"
"Whatever It Takes" is composed in the key of C major. Its lyrics show the need to be committed and open to sustain a relationship to make things work out.

According to the sheet music published at Musicnotes.com by Alfred Music Publishing, the song is set in common time with a "moderately slow" tempo of 76 beats per minute. It is composed in the key of C major with Wade's vocal range spanning from the low-note of D_{4} to the high-note of G_{5}. The song has a basic chord progression of C/F–C/G–C/F–C/G.

"Whatever It Takes" was described as an adult alternative/pop rock song. It was described as a "power ballad" by John DiBiase of Jesus Freak Hideout, who also noted that there was "growth in songwriting and artistry to keep Lifehouse a band well worth following".

Alex Lai of Contactmusic.com described the song as "brooding [song]" that features "a huge chorus" and noted how the ballads on the album, including "Whatever It Takes", were "amongst the best the band has produced".

Russ Breimeier of Christianity Today felt that the song was "commendable for showing the need to remain committed and open to sustain a relationship".

Paul Schultz of The Trades described the song as having "some dandy harmony vocals" and noted how the lyrics of "She said like it or not it's the way it's gotta be / You gotta love yourself if you can ever love me" talked about how people try to work out relationships.

== Chart performance ==
"Whatever It Takes" debuted at number 97 on the Billboard Hot 100 for the week of February 2, 2008. It moved up the chart for several weeks, until peaking at number 33. The song debuted at number 63 on the Billboard Digital Songs chart and eventually peaked at number 28 after being on the chart for 19 non-consecutive weeks. On the Billboard Pop Songs chart, the song debuted at number 40 for the week of January 26, 2008. After moving up the chart for 20 consecutive weeks, the song eventually peaked at number 17. The song debuted at number 74 on the Billboard Radio Songs chart for the week of March 8, 2008 and moved around the chart for several weeks until peaking at number 36. On the Adult Contemporary chart, the song debuted at number 30 for the week of April 26, 2008. After being on the chart for 33 consecutive weeks, the song peaked at number 10 for three weeks in a row. "Whatever It Takes" also debuted on the Billboard Adult Pop Songs at number 22 and eventually peaked at number three.

== Music video ==
The music video, directed by Frank Borin, premiered on Yahoo! Music on November 15, 2007. Later that day, it was also released to iTunes for digital download. According to the behind-the-scenes video, the song features the use of pyrotechnics all throughout the video. When asked about the idea behind the video, Wade said, "The whole concept of this video and just stuff exploding and breaking with my performance to the camera; it's almost like my performance is trying to salvage a relationship together. The imagery of stuff breaking and falling apart; its almost like the whole world shattering around you, but you're trying to keep it alive."

The video focuses solely on lead singer, Jason Wade, as the rest of the band members do not appear in the video. The video begins by showing Wade sitting alone on a bed, with pictures of him and his girlfriend on the wall. He proceeds to walk around the house, while various things in the room he's in begin to explode around him, such as the bed and pictures in the bedroom, and various food and drink items in the kitchen. Near the end things begin going in reverse, and everything that had exploded is put back together. The video ends with Wade sitting back on the bed with his girlfriend now lying next to him.

== Live performances ==
On October 15, 2007, Lifehouse performed an acoustic version of "Whatever It Takes" on VH1. In January 2008, the band performed the song as part of a set list on the PBS show Soundstage. To help promote Who We Are, Lifehouse also performed "Whatever It Takes" on The Tonight Show with Jay Leno on February 15, 2008, on Mas Vale Tarde on February 21, 2008, and on Live with Regis and Kelly on April 1, 2008.

== Credits and personnel ==
- Songwriting – Jason Wade, Jude Cole
- Production – Lifehouse, Jude Cole
- Mixing – Thom Panunzio, Jack Joseph Puig, Florian Ammon, Keith Armstrong, Dean Nelson, Jeff Rothschild
- Engineering – Florian Ammon, Scott Faircloff, Ross Hogarth, Will Sandalls

Source: Allmusic

== Charts ==
=== Weekly charts ===
Weekly chart performance for "Whatever It Takes"
Chart (2008)	Peak position
Quebec (ADISQ)	46
US Billboard Hot 100	33
US Adult Contemporary (Billboard)	10
US Adult Pop Airplay (Billboard)	3
US Christian Songs (Billboard)	28
US Pop Airplay (Billboard)	17

=== Year-end charts ===
Year-end chart performance for "Whatever It Takes"
Chart (2008)	Position
US Adult Contemporary (Billboard)	23
US Adult Top 40 (Billboard)	2
