= Broken (Lifehouse song) =

2008 song by Lifehouse

Single by Lifehouse

from the album Who We Are
- Released: July 8, 2008
- Length: 4:46 (album version); 4:15 (radio version)
- Label: Geffen
- Songwriter: Jason Wade
- Producers: John Fields, Jude Cole

Lifehouse singles chronology
"Whatever It Takes" (2007)	"Broken" (2008)	"Halfway Gone" (2009)

"Broken" is a song by American alternative band Lifehouse. It is the third single released from their fourth studio album, Who We Are (2007). Lead singer Jason Wade was inspired to write the song after he visited a friend in Nashville who needed a kidney transplant. Originally released on June 18, 2007, as the fifth track on Who We Are, the song was then edited for radio to give it more of a "rock" feel. The new radio version of the song was released via digital download on July 8, 2008.

The song received positive reviews from critics, as they applauded the use of instruments in the song. The song charted at number 83 and 84 in the United States and Canada respectively, and later charted in New Zealand at number 21. The song's music video premiered on VH1.com on September 16, 2008. It is set in the scene of a tunnel where Wade is walking away in the opposite direction of a car crash. Lifehouse has played "Broken" live on several occasions, including on Soundstage and at the 2011 Pinkpop Festival in the Netherlands. A seven-minute extended version is often the final song in their concert setlist.

== Background, release and composition ==
"Broken"
Lifehouse lead singer Jason Wade sings the main chorus of the song.

The song was written by Jason Wade, who originally finished the song in a hotel room after he visited a friend in Nashville who needed a kidney transplant. It was produced by John Fields and Scott Faircloff. In an interview with Alternative Addiction, Wade said, "Broken is the song that moves me the most. I wrote it in Nashville, about 6 months ago. I was in my hotel room at 3 AM, I was out there visiting a friend... he’s really sick, he needs a kidney transplant." Furthermore, he said, "That [the] song just kinda fell in my lap, and I really haven’t written a song like that since 'Hanging by a Moment' where it just happened within a 15 minute time period." Broken was released as the third single from the album on June 18, 2007. The song was then edited for radio to give it more of a "rock" feel and was released via digital download on July 8, 2008.

According to the sheet music published at Musicnotes.com by Sony/ATV Music Publishing, the song is set in common time with a slow tempo of 69 beats per minute. The sheet music is written in the key of C major with the vocal range spanning from the low-note of G_{3} to the high-note of G_{5}. The song has a basic chord progression of F_{2}–Am_{7}–F_{2}–Am_{7}–F_{2}–Am_{7}–C/G–G. Alex Lai of Contactmusic.com described it as a song "[that] features great string use and takes a tender tone". A review from Alternative Addiction said that the song was one of the best Wade has ever written and noted "[that] the more you listen to it, the better it gets."

== Chart performance ==
In the United States, "Broken" debuted at number 95 on the Billboard Hot 100 for the week of November 8, 2008. It fluctuated on the chart for several weeks, before reaching its peak of 83. The song debuted at number 70 on the Billboard Digital Songs chart and peaked at number 38 after being on the chart for three non-consecutive weeks. On the Billboard Adult Pop Songs chart, the song debuted at number 38 for the week of August 2, 2008 and after moving around the chart for 32 consecutive weeks, the song eventually peaked at number seven. The song was certified Platinum by the RIAA in January 2013.

The song also charted internationally. "Broken" debuted at number 92 on the Canadian Hot 100 for the week of January 26, 2008. On July 26, 2008, the song reappeared in the chart and peaked at number 84. It debuted at number 40 on the New Zealand Singles Chart for the week of May 26, 2008. After being on the chart for 13 consecutive weeks, the song eventually peaked at number 21.

== Promotion ==
=== Music video ===
Lifehouse lead singer Jason Wade looks on the scene of a deadly car crash.

The music video for "Broken" was filmed on August 24, 2008, in Los Angeles and was directed by Kiefer Sutherland and Frank Borin. It first premiered on VH1.com on September 16, 2008. Wade and Sutherland then appeared together on the VH1 Top 20 Video Countdown on September 20, 2008, to debut the music video on VH1. In an interview with Ultimate Guitar, Wade described his experience with working with Sutherland by saying, "Whilst listening to the song a little while back, Kiefer came up with the video's concept. Working with him was a great experience; with all of the expressions and very moments, Kiefer was extremely hands on. With him handling direction, acting in the music video was extremely easy."

The video starts with Jason Wade in the driver's seat of a car, with the other members of Lifehouse in the car with him. The traffic is at a stand still in a tunnel, as a swarm of people have abandoned their vehicles and are walking through. Wade and the band members get out of the car, and begin walking in the opposite direction of the crowd to the other side of the tunnel. Wade pushes through the people, who are in a rush to get to the entrance of the tunnel and is constantly focused on his destination to get to the end. When he reaches the tunnel's end, he sees the wreckage of a car crash with firefighters and paramedics cleaning up the mess. Wade then sees a girl observing what appears to be herself, dead inside one of the crashed car. He then looks to the left, and sees an old man observing himself, dead on the ground. As Wade looks into the other car, he sees himself, also seemingly dead. Upon this, Wade frantically runs back into the tunnel towards his car. Then he sees himself in the car with the band members, however everyone seems to be frozen as he bangs on the windows. Suddenly Wade is inside the car again, and a police officer comes to the window, motioning him to continue driving, since he is stopped in the middle of the tunnel for no apparent reason.

=== Live performances ===
Lifehouse performed "Broken" along with other songs on Nissan Live Sets on Yahoo! Music in 2007. On October 15, 2007, Lifehouse performed an acoustic version of the song on VH1. In January 2008, the band performed the song as part of a set list on the PBS show Soundstage. The song was also performed live at the 2011 Pinkpop Festival on June 11, 2011, as part of a set list of songs at the festival.

=== Media appearances ===
"Broken" was featured on General Hospital, Criminal Minds, Grey's Anatomy and One Tree Hill.

The song was used in the trailer for The Time Traveler's Wife.

== Credits and personnel ==
- Songwriting – Jason Wade
- Production – Jason Wade, Jude Cole
- Mixing – Thom Panunzio, Jack Joseph Puig, Florian Ammon, Keith Armstrong, Dean Nelson, Jeff Rothschild
- Engineering – Florian Ammon, Scott Faircloff, Ross Hogarth, Will Sandalls

Credits and personnel adapted from Allmusic.

== Charts ==
=== Weekly charts ===
Chart (2008–2009)	Peak position
Canada Hot 100 (Billboard)	84
New Zealand (Recorded Music NZ)	21
US Billboard Hot 100	83
US Adult Pop Airplay (Billboard)	7

=== Year-end charts ===
Chart (2008)	Position
US Adult Top 40 (Billboard)	33
Chart (2009)	Position
US Adult Top 40 (Billboard)	34

== Certifications and sales ==
Region	Certification	Certified units/sales
United States (RIAA)	Platinum	1,000,000^{^}
^{^} Shipments figures based on certification alone.

== Cover versions ==
Daniel Evans, a finalist on series 5 of The X Factor (UK) recorded a contemporary version on his 2013 iTunes extended play Reflections.

=== Trisha Yearwood version ===
"Broken"

Single by Trisha Yearwood

from the album The Passion: New Orleans
- Released: February 20, 2016
- Genre: Christian/Religious
- Length: 3:55
- Label: Deep Well; Virgin
- Songwriter: Jason Wade
- Producer: Adam Anders

Trisha Yearwood singles chronology
"PrizeFighter" (2014)	"Broken" (2016)	"Every Girl in This Town" (2019)

==== Background ====
"Broken" was notably recorded and released as a single by American country artist Trisha Yearwood. She recorded the track for the soundtrack of the live televised show, The Passion: New Orleans. Yearwood was cast to play Mother Mary in a modern-day depiction of Jesus Christ's final hours. The song (among the other songs performed for the film) was produced by Adam Anders. He had previously been part of other television shows such as Glee and Rock of Ages. It was among four tracks chosen for Yearwood to sing on the soundtrack. She also recorded "Hands," "My Love Is Your Love" and "I Won't Give Up." Yearwood described her feelings on "Broken" and the original Lifehouse version: "Their version of this song is so powerful. And it’s so vulnerable and so real and so in the moment..."

==== Critical reception ====
Yearwood's cover of "Broken" received a positive response from critics and writers. Kevin John Coyne of Country Universe gave the single an "A" rating in his review. Coyne commented that Yearwood's version of the song went beyond expectations in terms of production and vocal performance. Coyne added that the song can be compared to that of Yearwood's late 1990s hits that had similar pop-crossover styles: "It’s a powerhouse performance, and a reminder of that brief, late nineties period where Yearwood flirted with pop stardom. Of course she’s got the pipes to pull it off. We all know that." Laura McClellan from Taste of Country also gave the song positive reception in her review of the song's live performance: "Yearwood stood alone with only a mic as she sang, bringing her signature dynamic vocals to the song from beginning to end. It’s clear she feels the lyrics strongly, and her conviction and commitment to the song brings a new life to the tune."

==== Release and chart performance ====
"Broken" was released as a single via Virgin Records on February 20, 2016. It was her second single to reach the Billboard adult contemporary songs chart, peaking at number 17 on the list in May 2016. Additionally, the single charted on the Billboard Hot Christian Songs chart, peaking at number 48 after one week on the chart in March 2016. "Broken" is Yearwood's biggest adult contemporary hit to date. The song was used to promote The Passion television special through several commercials that aired in 2016. The song also gained traction on social media platforms, which also led to its further chart success. In reflecting on the song's success, Yearwood commented, "It’s been such a nice surprise." The song was officially released on the album's soundtrack on March 18, 2016. The show itself aired on the Fox network two days later as a live televised event.

==== Track listing ====
Music download

- "Broken" – 3:55

==== Charts ====
Chart (2016)	Peak position
US Adult Contemporary (Billboard)	16
US Hot Christian Songs (Billboard)	48
