= Passione =

Passione or La Passione may refer to:

== Film, theatre and television ==
- La Passione (1996 film), a 1996 film and soundtrack album by Chris Rea
- Passione (2010 film), a 2010 film about the music of Naples directed by John Turturro
- Passione, a mafia group from the manga and anime of the same name, JoJo's Bizarre Adventure: Golden Wind
- La Passione (2010 film), a 2010 Italian comedy film directed by Carlo Mazzacurati
- Passione (1953 film), a 1953 Italian film
- Passione (telenovela), a 2010 Brazilian telenovela
- Passione (play), 1980 play by Albert Innaurato

== Music ==
=== Compositions ===
- "Symphony No. 49 (Haydn) La passione, the 49th symphony by Joseph Haydn
- La Passione di Gesù Cristo libretto by Metastasio which was repeatedly set, including:
  - La Passione (Salieri) by Salieri
  - La Passione (Mayr) by Simon Mayr

=== Albums ===
- Passione, album by Luciano Pavarotti
- "Passione", album by Zizi Possi 1998
- Passione (Paul Potts album), 2009 album
- Passione (Andrea Bocelli album), 2013 album

=== Songs ===
- "Passione", 1934 song in the Canzone Napoletana genre by Libero Bovio, Ernesto Tagliaferri, and Nicola Valente

== Other uses ==
- Passione (company), a Japanese animation studio

== See also ==
- Passion (disambiguation)
