= Pasiones =

Pasiones may refer to:

- Pasiones (album), a 1994 album by Ednita Nazario
- Pasiones (TV channel), an American pay television channel

== See also ==
- Passions (disambiguation)
