= Harper B. Smith =

American photojournalist

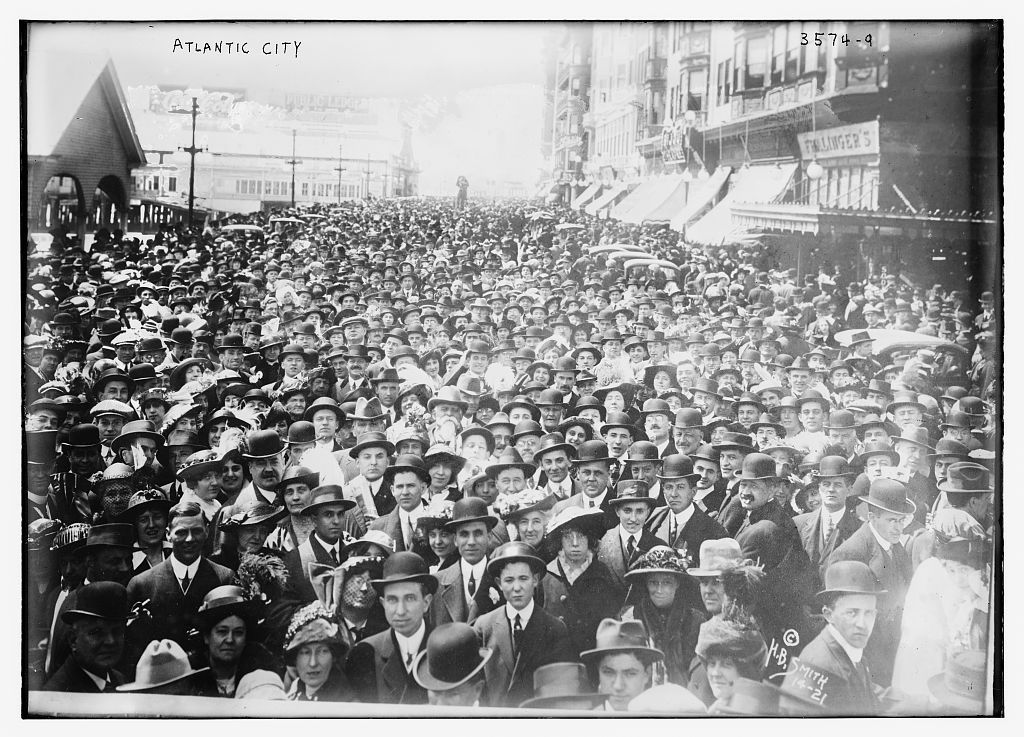

Harper B. Smith (January 1873 – August 3, 1917) was the official photographer for Atlantic City, New Jersey, and a photographer for Underwood & Underwood.

== Biography ==
He was born in York, Pennsylvania, in January 1873. Around 1892 he moved to Atlantic City, New Jersey. He died on August 3, 1917.
