= Robert Deaton =

American film and television producer

- Born: North Carolina
- Occupations: Television producer; film producer; director; record producer
- Years active: 1985–present
- Notable work: CMA Awards; CMA Music Fest; Billboard Music Awards

Robert Deaton is an American film and television producer and director. Since 2007, he has been the executive producer of the Country Music Association Awards on ABC and was the executive producer of the Billboard Music Awards on NBC from 2018 to 2022. He first came to prominence producing and directing predominately country music videos as creator and founder of the production company, Deaton-Flanigen Productions (DFP). The firm's clientele included acts like Martina McBride, Brooks & Dunn, Reba McEntire, and numerous others. Through DFP, Deaton also worked on the opening title sequence for Monday Night Football and has directed or produced various commercials and television specials. In recent years, Deaton has worked as a producer on several albums for acts like Michael W. Smith, King Calaway, and Stone Cold Country, A 60th Anniversary Tribute to the Rolling Stones.

== Early life ==
Robert Deaton grew up largely in Fayetteville, North Carolina. His father worked in radio and television. Growing up, Deaton learned to play various instruments, including guitar and trumpet, and he played in several garage bands as a teenager.

== Career ==
After high school, Deaton moved to Nashville. He first earned work shooting news for the ABC affiliate WKRN and then transitioned to the marketing department shooting promos and other marketing content. In the mid-1980s, Deaton met George Flanigen, and the two founded the production company, Deaton-Flanigen Productions (DFP). The duo's early work included directing and producing regional commercials and music videos. By 1991, the firm had begun working with country music stars, creating music videos and other promotional material for Vern Gosdin, Dolly Parton, Clint Black, Willie Nelson, and others. That year, Deaton also began directing and producing commercials for various companies and organizations, including the Los Angeles Lakers, through DFP.

In 1992, Deaton began directing the opening sequence of ABC's Monday Night Football (MNF). The sequence featured Hank Williams Jr. performing a reworked version of his song, "All My Rowdy Friends Are Coming Over Tonight," cut with clips of that night's competing teams. Deaton won two Sports Emmy Awards in the first five years of working with MNF. In 1994, the duo won its first Country Music Association (CMA) Award for directing the music video for Martina McBride's "Independence Day". In 1995, Deaton was appointed to the CMA's board of directors.

Throughout the 1990s and early 2000s, Deaton continued directing music videos for acts like Diamond Rio, Brad Paisley, Reba McEntire, Big & Rich, Brooks & Dunn, and Rascal Flatts. The music video for Brooks & Dunn's "Believe" earned him his second CMA Award, and he also earned four Grammy nominations for directing other music videos. In 2003, Deaton pitched the idea of a television special to CBS that would showcase performances from the CMA Music Festival. The resultant two-hour special first aired in 2004 on CBS, but would later move to ABC where it would become known as the CMA Music Festival: Country's Night to Rock. Deaton continues to serve as executive producer of the annual show.

In 2005, Deaton directed the ABC television special Kenny Chesney: Somewhere in the Sun. In 2006, he was named the consulting producer for the ABC broadcast of the CMA Awards. In 2007, he was named producer where he worked alongside executive producer Walter C. Miller. Deaton became the show's executive producer in 2008, a title he continues to hold. In 2010, he became the executive producer of the CMA Country Christmas special that broadcasts annually on ABC. In the ensuing years, he worked as executive producer on a variety of projects including a Rascal Flatts TV special on ABC in 2011, an ABC reality singing competition series called Duets in 2012, a Tim McGraw and Faith Hill residency (Soul 2 Soul) at The Venetian Las Vegas in 2012, and the Michael W. Smith Christmas album, The Spirit of Christmas, in 2014.

In 2015, Deaton served as executive producer for the feature film, American Saturday Night: Live From The Grand Ole Opry, which featured live performances and backstage interviews with artists like Brad Paisley, Darius Rucker, and Blake Shelton. The film was nominated for the Grammy Award for Best Music Film in 2017. In 2016, he produced the Fox musical television special, The Passion: New Orleans presented by Tyler Perry. In 2017, he was signed by the United Talent Agency. That year, he also executive produced the Nashville segments of the Hand in Hand: A Benefit for Hurricane Relief special and was announced as the executive producer for the Billboard Music Awards ceremony on NBC.

In 2018, Deaton made his feature film directorial debut (alongside George Flanigen) with Benched. In 2021, Deaton extended his contract with the CMA for five years to remain the head of the association's television properties. That year, he also became the executive producer of New Year's Eve Live: Nashville's Big Bash, an annual New Year's Eve special on CBS. In 2022, he served as executive producer of the documentary film, Johnny Cash: The Redemption of an American Icon. In 2023, Deaton is producing Stone Cold Country, a Rolling Stones tribute album featuring various country artists including Brooks & Dunn, Elle King, Maren Morris, Eric Church, and others. The album is due to be released in March 2023.

== Credits ==
=== Film ===
List of feature film credits
Year	Title	Role	Notes
2015	American Saturday Night: Live From The Grand Ole Opry	Executive producer	
2018	Benched	Director	Co-directed with George Flanigen
2022	Johnny Cash: The Redemption of an American Icon	Producer	Documentary

=== Television ===
List of television credits
Year	Title	Role	Notes
2004–present	CMA Music Festival: Country's Night to Rock	Executive producer	ABC annual TV special (known as CMA: Best of Fest in 2020 and CMA Summer Jam in 2021)
2005	Kenny Chesney: Somewhere in the Sun	Producer	ABC TV special
2006–present	Country Music Association Awards	Consulting producer (2006); Producer (2007); Executive producer (2008–present)	ABC annual awards ceremony
2010–present	CMA Country Christmas	Executive producer	ABC annual TV special
2011	Rascal Flatts: Nothing Like This	Executive producer	ABC TV special
2012	Duets	Executive producer	ABC reality competition series
2014	Sports Illustrated Swimsuit: 50 Years of Beautiful	Executive producer	NBC TV special
2015	The Passion: New Orleans	Executive producer	Fox music TV special
2017	Hand in Hand: A Benefit for Hurricane Relief	Executive producer (Nashville segments)	Benefit concert TV special simulcast on multiple networks
2018–2022	Billboard Music Awards	Executive producer	NBC annual awards ceremony
2021–present	New Year's Eve Live: Nashville's Big Bash	Executive producer	CBS annual TV special

=== Music ===
List of album credits
Year	Album	Artist	Role	Notes
2014	The Spirit of Christmas	Michael W. Smith	Executive producer	US #16
2019	Rivers	King Calaway	Executive producer	
2023	Stone Cold Country	Various	Executive producer	The Rolling Stones tribute album

== Nominations and awards ==
Year	Award	Category	Nominee	Result	Ref.
1994	Country Music Association Awards	Music Video of the Year	"Independence Day" by Martina McBride (Robert Deaton and George Flanigen, co-directors)	Won	
1994	Academy of Country Music Awards	Video of the Year	"Independence Day" by Martina McBride (Robert Deaton and George Flanigen, co-directors)	Nominated	
1998	Academy of Country Music Awards	Video of the Year	"A Broken Wing" by Martina McBride (Robert Deaton and George Flanigen, co-directors)	Nominated	
1998	Country Music Association Awards	Music Video of the Year	"A Broken Wing" by Martina McBride (Robert Deaton and George Flanigen, co-directors)	Nominated	
1998	Academy of Country Music Awards	Video of the Year	"How Your Love Makes Me Feel" by Diamond Rio (Robert Deaton and George Flanigen, co-directors)	Nominated	
2000	Country Music Association Awards	Music Video of the Year	"He Didn't Have to Be" by Brad Paisley (Robert Deaton and George Flanigen, co-directors)	Nominated	
2000	Academy of Country Music Awards	Video of the Year	"He Didn't Have to Be" by Brad Paisley (Robert Deaton and George Flanigen, co-directors)	Nominated	
2000	Academy of Country Music Awards	Video of the Year	"Single White Female" by Chely Wright (Robert Deaton and George Flanigen, co-directors)	Nominated	
2001	Grammy Awards	Best Short Form Music Video	"What Do You Say" by Reba McEntire (Robert Deaton and George Flanigen, co-directors)	Nominated	
2003	Country Music Association Awards	Music Video of the Year	"Concrete Angel" by Martina McBride (Robert Deaton and George Flanigen, co-directors)	Nominated	
2004	Academy of Country Music Awards	Video of the Year	"Concrete Angel" by Martina McBride (Robert Deaton and George Flanigen, co-directors)	Nominated	
2004	Grammy Awards	Best Short Form Music Video	"Concrete Angel" by Martina McBride (Robert Deaton and George Flanigen, co-directors)	Nominated	
2005	Country Music Association Awards	Music Video of the Year	"When I Think About Cheatin'" by Gretchen Wilson (Robert Deaton and George Flanigen, co-directors)	Nominated	
2005	Academy of Country Music Awards	Video of the Year	"Save a Horse (Ride a Cowboy)" by Big & Rich (Robert Deaton and George Flanigen, co-directors)	Nominated	
2006	Country Music Association Awards	Music Video of the Year	"8th of November" by Big & Rich (Robert Deaton and George Flanigen, co-directors)	Nominated	
2006	Country Music Association Awards	Music Video of the Year	"Believe" by Brooks & Dunn (Robert Deaton and George Flanigen, co-directors)	Won	
2006	Academy of Country Music Awards	Video of the Year	"Believe" by Brooks & Dunn (Robert Deaton and George Flanigen, co-directors)	Nominated	
2006	Grammy Awards	Best Short Form Music Video	"God's Will" by Martina McBride (Robert Deaton and George Flanigen, co-directors)	Nominated	
2007	Country Music Association Awards	Music Video of the Year	"Anyway" by Martina McBride (Robert Deaton and George Flanigen, co-directors)	Nominated	
2007	Academy of Country Music Awards	Video of the Year	"8th of November" by Big & Rich (Robert Deaton and George Flanigen, co-directors)	Nominated	
2007	Grammy Awards	Best Short Form Music Video	"8th of November" by Big & Rich (Robert Deaton and George Flanigen, co-directors)	Nominated	
2008	Academy of Country Music Awards	Video of the Year	"Lost in This Moment" by Big & Rich (Robert Deaton and George Flanigen, co-directors)	Nominated	
2017	Grammy Awards	Best Music Film	American Saturday Night: Live from the Grand Ole Opry (Robert Deaton, co-producer)	Nominated	
