= Manchester Passion =

2006 British television special

- Created by: Andy King-Dabbs & Stephen Powell
- Written by: Andy King-Dabbs & Stephen Powell
- Presented by: Keith Allen
- Starring: Darren Morfitt
- Country of origin: United Kingdom

Production
- Producer: Andy King-Dabbs & Stephen Powell
- Running time: 60 minutes

Original release
- Network: BBC Three
- Release: 14 April 2006

Manchester Passion is a British television special which was broadcast by BBC Three on 14 April 2006. Created and scripted by Andy King-Dabbs and Stephen Powell as a follow-up to BBC Classical Music's previous BBC Three special, Flashmob – The Opera, it was a contemporary retelling of the Passion of Jesus Christ set to British popular music, broadcast live from various locations in Manchester, England, culminating with the procession of a large, lighted cross to the main stage at Albert Square. The broadcast was presented and narrated by Keith Allen, and starred Darren Morfitt as Jesus. Denise Johnson played Mary, Tim Booth played Judas, and Nicholas Bailey played Peter. Music was provided by a 16-piece string orchestra and soloists on accordion, cello, and guitar. The BBC Executive Producer was Sue Judd and the music arrangements were by Philip Sheppard.

While originally held as a one-off event, Dutch producer Jacco Doornbos created a localized version of the special known as The Passion, which was first broadcast in the Netherlands in 2011. The Passion has since been broadcast annually in different Dutch cities, and its format has also been exported to other countries, including Belgium, Germany and the United States. In 2020 there would be another British version, held in Cardiff.

== Cast ==
- Presenter/Pontius Pilate – Keith Allen
- Peter – Nicholas Bailey
- Judas Iscariot – Tim Booth
- Jesus – Darren Morfitt
- Mary – Denise Johnson
- Barabbas – Chris Bisson
- Criminal in van – Bez
- Himself – Anthony Wilson

== Songs ==
- Morrissey – "You're Gonna Need Someone on Your Side" (from the album Your Arsenal)
- Oasis – "Cast No Shadow"
- Joy Division – "Love Will Tear Us Apart"
- M People – "Search for the Hero"
- The Smiths – "Heaven Knows I'm Miserable Now" (performed by Judas Iscariot as he betrays Jesus)
- James – "Sit Down"
- New Order – "Blue Monday"
- The Stone Roses – "I Am the Resurrection" (the majority of the song was sung by Peter after the arrest of Jesus, with the line "I Am the Resurrection" being sung by Jesus as a climax to the play)
- Robbie Williams – "Angels"
- Oasis – "Wonderwall"
- Elkie Brooks – "Sunshine After the Rain"
- Happy Mondays – "Hallelujah" (instrumental)
- Buzzcocks – "Ever Fallen in Love (With Someone You Shouldn't've)" (instrumental)
- 808 State – "Pacific State"
- Black Grape – "In the Name of the Father" (instrumental)

== Reception ==
The production was praised by Bishop of Manchester Nigel McCulloch, who felt that Manchester Passion had "a sincerity and an ability to shock and connect that is not far removed from how it must have been on the first Good Friday."
