= 1994 Country Music Association Awards =

Annual US music awards ceremony

- Date: October 5, 1994
- Location: Grand Ole Opry House, Nashville, Tennessee
- Hosted by: Vince Gill
- Most wins: Vince Gill (3)
- Most nominations: Reba McEntire (6)

Television/radio coverage
- Network: CBS

The 1994 Country Music Association Awards, 28th Ceremony, was held on Wednesday October 5, 1994, at the Grand Ole Opry House, Nashville, Tennessee, and was hosted by CMA Award Winner, Vince Gill.

== Winners and Nominees ==
Winner are in Bold.

Entertainer of the Year	Album of the Year
**Vince Gill**; Brooks & Dunn; Garth Brooks; Alan Jackson; Reba McEntire	**Common Thread: The Songs of the Eagles — Various Artists**; Who I Am — Alan Jackson; Easy Come Easy Go — George Strait; Asleep at the Wheel: Tribute to the Music of Bob Wills and the Texas Playboys — Various Artists; Rhythm, Country and Blues — Various Artists
Male Vocalist of the Year	Female Vocalist of the Year
**Vince Gill**; John Anderson; Alan Jackson; George Strait; Dwight Yoakam	**Pam Tillis**; Mary Chapin Carpenter; Reba McEntire; Wynonna; Trisha Yearwood
Vocal Group of the Year	Vocal Duo of the Year
**Diamond Rio**; Alabama; Little Texas; Sawyer Brown; Confederate Railroad	**Brooks & Dunn**; Bellamy Brothers; Brother Phelps; Orrall & Wright; Sweethearts of the Rodeo
Single of the Year	Song of the Year
**"I Swear" — John Michael Montgomery**; "Does He Love You" — Reba McEntire and Linda Davis; "Don't Take the Girl" — Tim McGraw; "He Thinks He'll Keep Her" — Mary Chapin Carpenter; "How Can I Help You Say Goodbye" — Patty Loveless	**"Chattahoochee" — Alan Jackson and Jim McBride**; "Don't Take The Girl" — Craig Martin and Larry Johnson; "He Thinks He'll Keep Her" — Mary Chapin Carpenter and Don Schlitz; "I Swear" — Frank J. Myers and Gary Baker; "Little Rock' — Tom Douglas
Horizon Award	Musician of the Year
**John Michael Montgomery**; Faith Hill; Martina McBride; Tim McGraw; Lee Roy Parnell	**Mark O'Connor**; Eddie Bayers; Brent Mason; Matt Rollings; Brent Rowan
Music Video of the Year	Vocal Event of the Year
**Independence Day — Martina McBride**; Does He Love You — Reba McEntire and Linda Davis; God Blessed Texas — Little Texas; How Can I Help You Say Goodbye — Patty Loveless; Standing Outside the Fire — Garth Brooks	**Does He Love You — Reba McEntire and Linda Davis**; I Fall To Pieces — Trisha Yearwood and Aaron Neville; Mark O'Connor & The New Nashville Cats (feat. Vince Gill, Ricky Skaggs, Steve Wariner); Tammy Wynette, Loretta Lynn, Dolly Parton; The Devil Comes Back To Georgia — Mark O'Connor, Marty Stuart, Charlie Daniels, Johnny Cash, Travis Tritt

== Hall of Fame ==
Country Music Hall Of Fame Inductees
- Merle Haggard
