= The Passion: New Orleans =

- Created by: Jacco Doornbos
- Based on: The Passion franchise
- Written by: Peter Barsocchini
- Directed by: David Grifhorst
- Presented by: Tyler Perry
- Starring: Jencarlos; Trisha Yearwood; Prince Royce; Chris Daughtry; Seal
- Narrated by: Tyler Perry
- Composer: Adam Anders Peer Astrom
- Country of origin: United States
- Original language: English

Production
- Executive producer: Robert Deaton
- Producers: Allen Shapiro; Adam Anders; Mike Mahan; Mark Bracco; David Arvesen; Robert Deaton
- Production companies: Dick Clark Productions; Anders Media; Eye2Eye Media

Original release
- Network: Fox
- Release: March 20, 2016

The Passion: New Orleans (also known as simply The Passion) is an American music television special that was broadcast by Fox on March 20, 2016. Based on the Dutch franchise of the same name (which in turn, was adapted from a BBC special) and produced by Dick Clark Productions and Eye2Eye Media, it was a contemporary retelling of the Passion of Jesus Christ set to popular music, through a mixture of live and pre-recorded segments filmed from locations around New Orleans.

It starred Jencarlos Canela, Prince Royce, Trisha Yearwood, Chris Daughtry, and Seal. Tyler Perry hosted and narrated the special, while Nischelle Turner served as a correspondent for the procession of a cross to Woldenberg Park.

The Passion received mixed reviews, with critics panning the format and direction of the special (including Tyler Perry's restrained narration, and the procession segments) as being akin to a Super Bowl halftime show and Dick Clark's New Year's Rockin' Eve, and some of its song choices as having a weak thematic relevance to the story of Jesus. Seal's performances as Pontius Pilate were regarded as a standout by several critics.

== Production ==
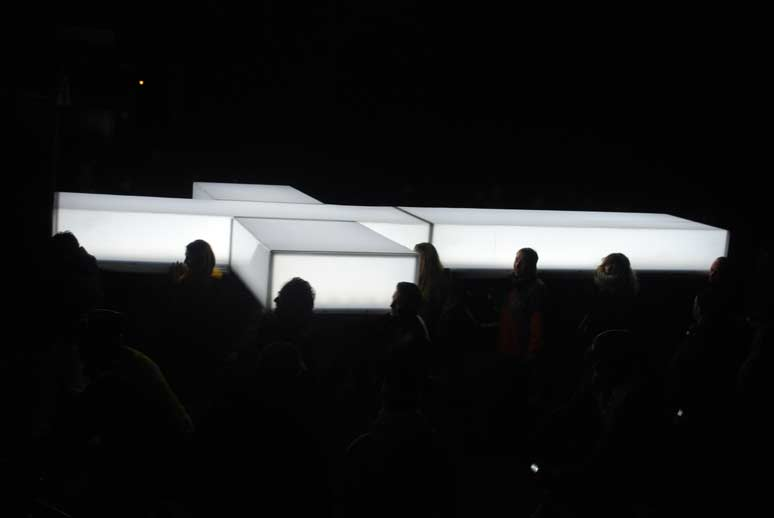
As in the original Dutch versions of the special, the broadcast culminated with the procession of an illuminated cross to its main stage.

In December 2015, Fox announced that Tyler Perry, a New Orleans native, would host and narrate a television special based on the final hours of Jesus Christ's life, broadcast live from New Orleans on March 20, 2016 (Palm Sunday), and produced by Eye2Eye Media and Dick Clark Productions. The special was formatted as a musical containing contemporary songs, and featured the procession of an illuminated cross from Champions Square (outside the Mercedes-Benz Superdome) to a stage at Woldenberg Park.

The story was portrayed using modernized imagery, and a script adapted from Bible scriptures by Peter Barsocchini of High School Musical fame, with the vetting of the American Bible Society. Producer Mark Bracco explained that The Passion would be "modern" and "inclusive", "whether you are a believer or wants to hear Trisha Yearwood sing a Whitney Houston song". Perry emphasized the significance of using the city of New Orleans as the setting for the special; drawing parallels between Hurricane Katrina and the resurrection of Jesus, he stated that New Orleans had "literally [risen] again from a liquid grave."

The special was an American adaptation of a Dutch television special of the same name, which has been broadcast annually since 2011, and was, in turn, a localized version of the BBC's 2006 special Manchester Passion. Creator Jacco Doornbos, who conceptualized the special in 2007 after learning that only 25% of people in the Netherlands were aware of the story of Easter, described The Passion as having become the largest annual television event in the Netherlands. The 2015 edition was seen by approximately 3.57 million viewers, a 46% share. The Passion was Fox's second live musical, with Grease Live! airing two months prior.

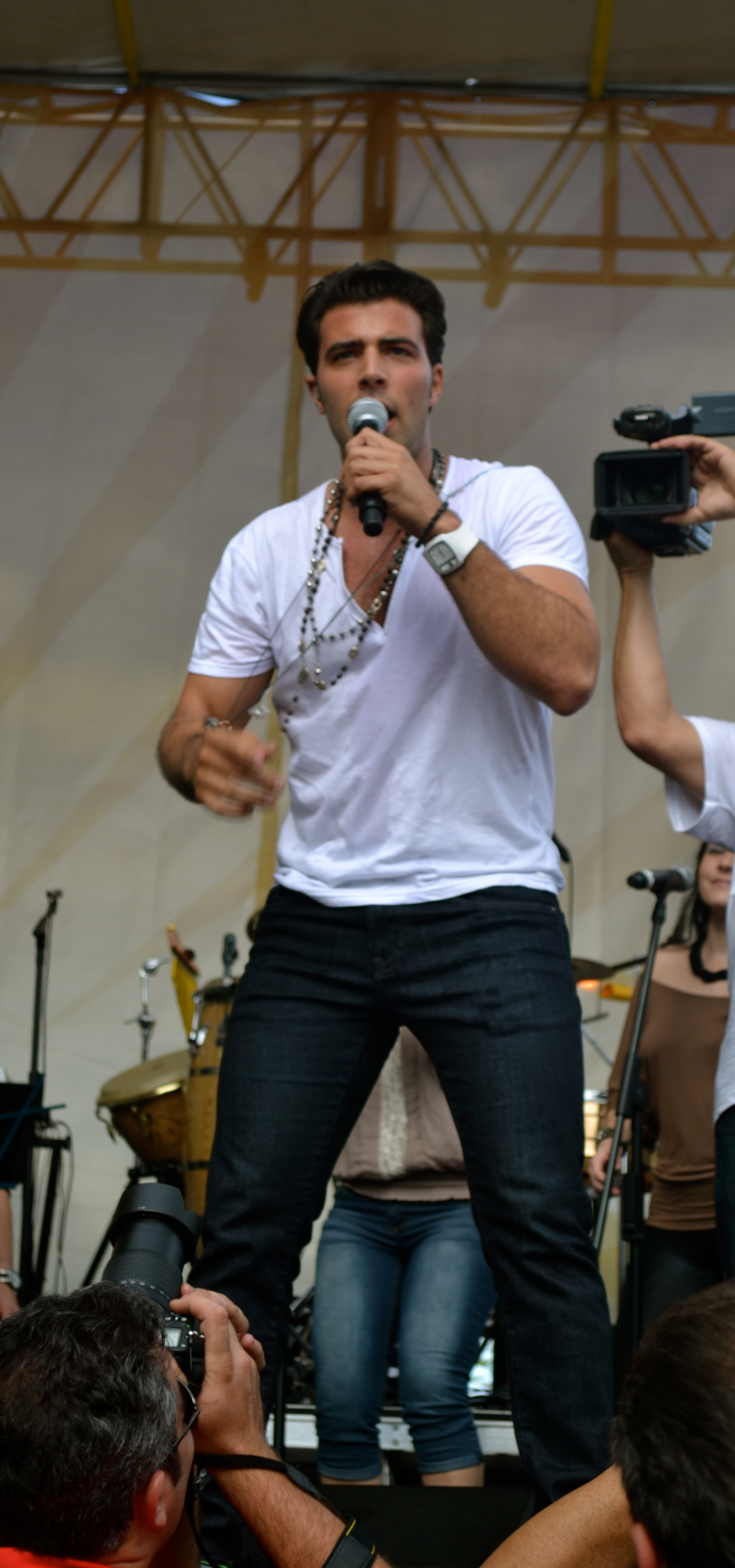
Jencarlos Canela in 2012

Adam Anders, who previously worked on fellow Fox series Glee, served as executive producer and music director for The Passion. He elaborated that the goal of the special's soundtrack was to present well-known songs "in a completely new context". Chris Daughtry, an American Idol alumnus who was cast as Judas, stated that his songs—Imagine Dragons' "Demons" (which was performed as a duet with Jesus—played by Jencarlos Canela, during Judas's betrayal) and Evanescence's "Bring Me to Life", would be "very different interpretations" of the original tracks. Anders felt that the project fit well with Fox due to the network's history with music-based series, such as Glee (a series which Anders also worked on) and Empire. Anders believed that the "power" of the presentation and its use of popular music helped influence the popularity of The Passion in the Netherlands—where, according to a recent survey, more people practiced atheism or agnosticism combined than theism. As such, Anders felt that the concept could be "huge" in the U.S. due to the level of religious practice in the country. He stressed that the integrity of the story would be maintained, remarking that "I'm a pastor's kid, and I have a cheese alarm that goes off easily. I knew I couldn't have the disciples breakdancing."

The concept of The Passion was met with skepticism; Anders remarked that he had difficulty convincing musicians to allow use of their songs because the concept of The Passion was difficult to explain, while Chris Daughtry and Prince Royce were initially hesitant towards the concept of participating in an overtly religious production. Daughtry did remark that he enjoyed the idea of playing an antagonist, and felt that Judas was a "very human" and "very relatable" character. Prince Royce, who was cast as Saint Peter, similarly promised that he would take his role seriously and not act as "the normal Prince Royce who takes his shirt off and gets the girls screaming". Tyler Perry, who practices Christianity, was enthusiastic about being involved in such an event occurring in his hometown, and joked that contributing to a project that he did not personally create was like a "vacation". He felt that the modern setting and contemporary music would make the story more accessible to a general audience.

Top Chef alumuna and celebrity chef Carla Hall made a cameo appearance staffing a food truck that Jesus used to cater the Last Supper, while the Preservation Hall Jazz Band also appeared for a performance of "When the Saints Go Marching In". Nischelle Turner served as a co-host, primarily serving as a reporter along the procession route to Woldenberg Park.

== Cast and characters ==
- Jencarlos as Jesus Christ
- Trisha Yearwood as Mary
- Prince Royce as Saint Peter
- Chris Daughtry as Judas Iscariot
- Seal as Pontius Pilate
- Michael W. Smith as a disciple
- Shane Harper as a disciple
- Gabriel Conte as a disciple

== Broadcast ==
The Passion was broadcast by Fox on March 20, 2016; the telecast was preceded by the premiere of an Easter-themed Ice Age special, The Great Egg-Scapade. In Canada, The Passion aired on Omni Television in simulcast with Fox.

The special received a 4.3/7 household rating, putting it behind NBC's Little Big Shots as the second-highest rated show of the night. Netflix acquired international digital rights to The Passion outside of the United States and Netherlands; it was made available for streaming beginning on March 25, 2016.

== Soundtrack ==
The Passion: New Orleans - Music From the Live Television Event

Soundtrack album by Various Artists
- Released: March 18, 2016
- Labels: Deep Well; Virgin Records
- Producers: Adam Anders; Peer Åström

The official soundtrack album for The Passion was released on March 18, 2016. Copies sold at Target and Walmart stores contained two exclusive bonus tracks each.

The soundtrack debuted at #8 on the Billboard 200 chart, while Chris Daughtry's cover of "Bring Me to Life" debuted at #2 on the April 9, 2016 Billboard Hard Rock Digital Songs chart, as the most-downloaded single from the soundtrack.

The Passion: New Orleans: Music from the Live Television Event
No.	Title	Artist(s)	Length
1.	"When Love Takes Over"	Yolanda Adams
2.	"Love Can Move Mountains" (featuring Jencarlos, Prince Royce, Chris Daughtry, Shane Harper & Michael W. Smith)	The Passion Cast
3.	"My Love Is Your Love"	Trisha Yearwood
4.	"Home"	Jencarlos & Prince Royce
5.	"With Arms Wide Open"	Jencarlos
6.	"Hands"	Trisha Yearwood
7.	"Bring Me to Life"	Chris Daughtry
8.	"Calling All Angels"	Jencarlos
9.	"I Won't Give Up"	Trisha Yearwood
10.	"Demons"	Chris Daughtry & Jencarlos
11.	"The Reason"	Prince Royce
12.	"You'll Never Walk Alone"	Trisha Yearwood
13.	"We Don't Need Another Hero"	Seal & Jencarlos
14.	"Mad World"	Seal
15.	"Broken"	Trisha Yearwood
16.	"Unconditionally"	Jencarlos

Target-exclusive songs
No.	Title	Artist(s)	Length
17.	"He Will Never End"	Michael W. Smith
18.	"Hold You Up" (Extended Mix)	Shane Harper

Walmart-exclusive songs
No.	Title	Artist(s)	Length
17.	"When the Saints Go Marching In"	Yolanda Adams and the Preservation Hall Jazz Band
18.	"With Arms Wide Open" (Spanish Version)	Jencarlos

== Reception ==
The Passion received mixed reviews; review aggregator Metacritic listed the special with a score of 40 based on 9 critic reviews, indicating "mixed or average" reviews.

Jeff Jensen of Entertainment Weekly described most of its performances as featuring "boy band video camaraderie", with little acting besides "poses of earnestly generated emotion", as well as attempts (such as headset mics) to deceive viewers into believing the pre-recorded sequences were being presented live. The song choices were criticized for having a weak thematic relevance (such as "Demons" being only a "pat, unsatisfying explanation for Judas' betrayal"), although he did single out "Calling All Angels" for giving "affecting voice" to Gethsemane, and Seal's scenes and performances as Pontius Pilate as being the "most 'live' dramatic moment" of the night. Jensen described Perry's narration as being repetitive, "cliché", and "like a more subdued Ryan Seacrest counting down the minutes to New Year's", while the "cheeriness and get-to-the-point hurriedness" of Nischelle Turner's procession interviews "bent" their "poignant" stories "toward the rah-rah product endorsements." The shortcomings of the special as a whole were exemplified by its resurrection scene (where Jencarlos sang Katy Perry's "Unconditionally" on the roof of the Westin New Orleans hotel), arguing that "a more effective final image would have been to place Jesus on the ground and moving among in his people [sic] as he did after his resurrection and as the Holy Spirit did on Pentecost", but by separating Jesus from the audience, it instead "created a metaphor for how so many people experience God—far away; hard to see—and a metaphor for a TV spectacle full of simplistic passion but failed as engaging play."

Emma Green of The Atlantic felt that "in some ways, [The Passion] was the perfect portrayal of Jesus for the 21st century", but that it "[seemed] to suggest that the middle- and upper-middle class people watching at home will most resonate with the story of a poor fisherman if they see him dressed and coiffeured like he’s headed to Starbucks." The contributions of Turner were described as being a "highly orchestrated woman-on-the-street reporting in the middle of a very expensive, highly inorganic spectacle" not unlike New Year's Rockin' Eve, and with political overtones surrounding Katrina. Green felt that the goal of The Passion was to emphasize "strong performances, glitzy visuals, and perhaps a nostalgia for the early years of American Idol", exemplified by the "undeniably stunning" resurrection scene (albeit noting that it was set to "arguably the worst Katy Perry song, and one that probably wasn't written about God or Jesus"). In conclusion, The Passion was considered to be a "solid take" on the concept of live television musicals, but acknowledged the "inherent tension between entertainment and faith: the former thrives on glitz and glam, while most religions explicitly reject that kind of showmanship in favor of humility before God." Green also suggested that the portrayal of Jesus being arrested by police officers would have been a "powerful political message" if he were played by an African-American, and that the cross should have been carried by the homeless and poor if the producers "truly wanted to make a statement about faith".

Mike Hale of The New York Times likened The Passion to a Super Bowl halftime show, noting that while the concept could be excused as having a "familial connection" to traditional passion plays, "the slick, relatively gaffe-free broadcast was intended not to arouse any unruly emotions or to offend any particular religious sensibilities". Hale felt that Tyler Perry's narration was "wooden" in its writing, and suggested that the pop-rock power ballads used in The Passion "demonstrated that generic love and breakup lyrics can be adapted to almost any circumstance, even to describe Christ's pain on the cross (which was also graphically described by Mr. Perry, in one of the show's stranger moments)." However, Hale felt that the resurrection scene was the "theatrical coup" of the presentation, and commended it for producing the "genuine" moment of crowd members using their phones to record the scene, "just as they would if the resurrection happened today".

Greg Evans of Deadline Hollywood described The Passion as being "equal parts sermon and Super Bowl halftime show", and "overstuffed with sincerity, good intentions and hammy musical performances, all melting into a big batch of goo faster than a chocolate bunny in the sun." He noted that the production frequently switched between dramatic segments that were "ruthlessly condensed and fully reliant on Perry's stagebound exposition", Trisha Yearwood "ostensibly [playing] Mary" by singing songs from the main stage, and coverage and interviews from the procession. Evans felt that Seal's performance of "Mad World" was the "best musical moment" of the special, and also noted that unlike many Passion productions, the crucifixion of Jesus was not visually depicted, and that it "entirely avoided the Passion pitfalls of history, handing the 'give us Barabbas!' cries to the crowd rather than any scapegoated minority. It was the evening’s rare moment of restraint, and rather inspired."

Robert Blanco of USA Today felt that The Passion was "well-sung, to be sure" but wasn't "well thought-out", noting odd choices of songs such as "Bring Me to Life", which "told you nothing specific about the turmoil of the man who was about to betray Christ", and "I Won't Give Up", which "[felt] far more romantic than maternal, just as Yearwood felt more Country Star than Virgin Mother". It was also noted that because Yearwood only performed from the main stage, she did not directly interact with most of the cast, and it was also suspected that some of the performance segments may have been pre-recorded. In conclusion, Blanco felt that The Passion was part of a "great artistic tradition" of adaptations of the story of Jesus (such as Jesus Christ Superstar and Godspell) that seek to "speak to different people at different times in ways they can understand", arguing that "there's no question many in the crowd were moved; there were tear-stained faces during Perry's recounting of the crucifixion and cheers when he reached the resurrection. If you were one of those people for whom this version worked, then God bless. But please, have mercy on the rest of us."

Bethonie Butler of the Washington Post felt that despite the entertainment-oriented nature of the production and the lack of visual depictions of violence, The Passion was "unapologetically religious" and "felt kind of like a service at a multicultural megachurch". Owing to its use of segments featuring interviews from the procession route (which led to a Twitter user joking that it felt like a concert special aired during a PBS pledge drive), the format of The Passion was described as feeling "like less of a play and more of a series of a musical performances, all of which were solid, if a bit zany." Butler touted that despite its nature as a spectacle, and viewers who did not believe that the portrayals were biblically accurate, "many were moved at the sight of Jesus and Christianity front and center on their television set, not to mention that cross glowing down Bourbon Street", and that the significance of The Passion's New Orleans setting resonated best with the live audience.

== See also ==
- 2016 in American television
- Jesus Christ Superstar Live in Concert (2018)
