= The Passion (1999 TV series) =

1999 British TV series

The Passion is a three-episode 1999 British television series written by Mick Ford. It was set in, and filmed in North Devon, and related events set around a local amateur production of a passion play.
