= Hartwig Masuch =

German music executive (born 1954)

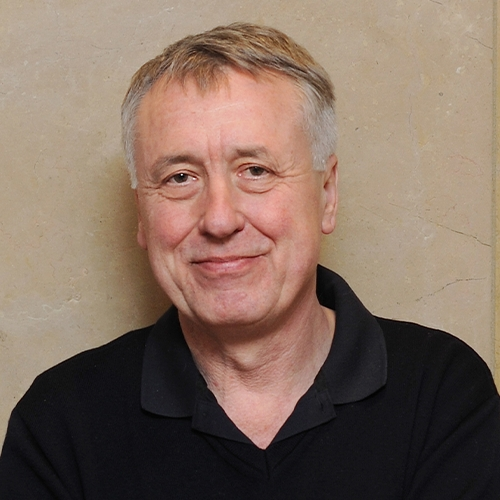
- Hartwig Masuch
- Born: July 20, 1954 (age 72); Hagen, Germany
- Education: Ruhr University Bochum
- Known for: CEO of BMG

Hartwig Masuch (born July 20, 1954) is a German music executive. Since 2008, he has been chief executive officer of BMG Rights Management, a Bertelsmann group division. Under his leadership, BMG became a leading international music company. According to Billboard, he is among the most influential representatives of the industry in the world. Masuch was himself a musician and producer and is considered a pioneer of the Neue Deutsche Welle.

== Early life ==
After graduating high school, Masuch began studying economics at the Ruhr University Bochum in 1974. At the same time, he worked for the chair of money theory, and was the frontman of the Ramblers, a punk and new wave band. To finance his livelihood, he worked as a taxi driver at times. At the age of 20, Masuch signed his first recording contract. In 1980, he finished his studies without graduation to concentrate on his career as a musician.

Masuch founded an independent music publishing house, was the first to sign with Nena, and produced the debut album of Extrabreit. Since then, he has been regarded as a pioneer of Neue Deutsche Welle. He also established his own music label and was responsible for hits by Ina Deter and others before selling it in 1984.

== Career ==
In 1985 Masuch joined Warner Music Publishing as general manager of repertoire. After two years he was promoted to the position of general manager and vice president of creative affairs. During this time he signed nationally and internationally successful bands. In 1991, Masuch joined BMG Music Publishing, a subsidiary of Bertelsmann, as managing director and senior vice president. There he was mainly responsible for business in Germany, Austria, and Switzerland. Masuch left the company in 2007 to sell BMG Music Publishing to Universal Music, where he advised Bertelsmann on the separation from Sony BMG and the reorganization of activities in the music industry.

Masuch coordinated the administration and marketing of the music rights to works by around 200 European artists, such as the Prinzen, that remained with the group. The catalog formed the cornerstone for the foundation of BMG Rights Management in 2008. Masuch was managing it from the beginning, and positioned the company as a fair and service-oriented partner for artists. He also focused on digital marketing, especially on streaming services. With the support of Thomas Rabe, Chief Executive Officer of Bertelsmann, Masuch organized the temporary participation of the financial investor KKR. From 2009 to 2013, KKR supported the international expansion and numerous acquisitions of BMG Rights Management.

Since 2013, Masuch has been a member of Bertelsmann's group management committee, the highest management body below the executive board.

In January 2023, Masuch announced that he would retire from BMG at the end of the year. He named CFO Thomas Coesfeld as his successor as CEO.

== Criticism ==
The 2018 Echo Music Prize was overshadowed by a controversy over texts by Kollegah and Farid Bang that were perceived as anti-semitic. Masuch also had to explain himself for the release of the album by BMG Rights Management. He emphasized the principle of artistic freedom, which the company takes very seriously. BMG Rights Management stopped working with both rappers, and initiated a campaign against anti-semitism.
