= Contactmusic.com =

Online website of cultural criticism

- Website: contactmusic.com
- Launched: April 2000; 26 years ago
- Current status: Active

Contactmusic.com is a website of cultural criticism based in Leeds, West Yorkshire, England. It publishes reviews, interviews, and detailed essays on most cultural products and expressions in areas such as music, television, films, and theater.

== History ==
The website was created in April 2000 by a team of music and entertainment journalists. It has since expanded to over fifty staff and freelance contributors located around the globe, based on different continents and countries. Its staff includes writers from various backgrounds, ranging from academics and professional journalists to career professionals and first-time writers.

Contactmusic.com has been cited as a source by BBC Radio, The Express Tribune, Warp Records and Vogue, and was added to the list of ratings sources of Rotten Tomatoes.
