= I Believe in You =

I Believe in You may refer to:

== Film ==
- I Believe in You (film), a 1952 British film starring Celia Johnson

== Music ==
=== Albums ===
- I Believe in You. Your Magic Is Real., a 2007 album by Yacht
- I Believe in You (Dolly Parton album), 2017

=== Songs ===
- "I Believe in You" (Neil Young song), also covered by Linda Ronstadt, Rita Coolidge and others
- "I Believe in You" (Don Williams song)
- "I Believe in You" (Kylie Minogue song)
- "I Believe in You" (Mel Tillis song)
- "I Believe in You" (Nick Jonas song)
- "I Believe in You" (Paul Haig song)
- "I Believe in You" (Talk Talk song)
- "I Believe in You" (Frank Loesser song), 1961
- "I Believe in You (Je crois en toi)", a song by Celine Dion and II Divo, 2006
- "I Believe in You (You Believe in Me)", a song by Johnnie Taylor, 1973
- "I Believe in You", a song by Noel Cash, 1987
- "I Believe in You", a song by Agnes Carlsson from the album Stronger, 2006
- "I Believe in You", a song by Bob Dylan from the album Slow Train Coming, 1979
- "I Believe in You", a song by Brother Beyond from the album Trust, 1989
- "I Believe in You", a song by Frank Loesser from the musical How to Succeed in Business Without Really Trying, 1961
- "I Believe in You", a song by Jay Sean from the album Me Against Myself, 2004
- "I Believe in You", a song by No Angels from the album Destiny, 2007
- "I Believe in You", a song by Percy Sledge from the album I'll Be Your Everything, 1974, composed by Phillip Mitchell
- "I Believe in You", a song by Robin Zander from the album Robin Zander, 1993
- "I Believe in You", a song by Stryper from the album In God We Trust, 1988
- "I Believe in You", a song by Toy-Box from the album Fantastic, 1999
- "I Believe in You", a song by Twisted Sister from the album Come Out and Play, 1984
- "I Believe in You", a song by Y&T from the album Earthshaker, 1981
- "I Believe in You", a song by Joe featuring NSYNC from the album My Name Is Joe, 2000
- "I Believe in You", a song by Dolly Parton from I Believe in You, 2017
- "I Believe in You", a song by Michael Bublé from Nobody but Me, 2017
- "Pollyanna (I Believe in You)", a song by Catherine Warwick from the Mother soundtrack.

Songs with similar titles

- "I Don't Believe in You", a 1986 song by Talk Talk
- "I Believe in U", a 2017 song by Ukrainian singer Jamala
- "Believe in You", a song by Jude Cole from the album I Don't Know Why I Act This Way
- "I Believe in You and Me", a song by The Four Tops, 1982, also covered by Whitney Houston
- "I Believe You", a song by The Carpenters, 1978
- "I Believe You", a song by Celldweller from the album Celldweller

== See also ==
- I Still Believe in You (disambiguation)
- Believe in You (disambiguation)
