= Compared to Nothing =

Promotional single by Jude Cole

from the album A View from 3rd Street
- Released: April 1991
- Recorded: 1990
- Genre: Power pop; pop rock; soft rock; blue-eyed soul
- Length: 4:10
- Label: Reprise
- Songwriter: Jude Cole
- Producer: David Tyson

Jude Cole singles chronology
"House Full of Reasons" (1990)	"Compared to Nothing" (1991)	"Start the Car" (1992)

"Compared to Nothing" is a power ballad by Jude Cole. It was released as the ninth track and only promotional single from the studio album A View from 3rd Street in 1991. It was written by Cole and produced by David Tyson. "Compared to Nothing" features Jude Cole performing keyboards.

"Compared to Nothing" peaked at No. 81 on the RPM Top Singles Chart and No. 13 on the Canadian Adult Contemporary chart. It ranked at No. 90 on the year-end chart of the latter.

== Lyrics ==
"Compared to Nothing" is about the protagonist finding a reason to go on after losing the love of one's life.

== Track listing ==
All tracks are written by Jude Cole.

US promo
No.	Title	Length
1.	"Compared to Nothing"	4:10
Total length:		4:10

== Personnel ==
- Jude Cole – vocals, guitars, keyboards
- David Tyson – keyboards
- Lee Sklar – bass guitar
- Jeff Porcaro – drums
- Pat Mastelotto – percussion

== Charts ==
=== Weekly charts ===
Chart (1991)	Peak position
Canada Top Singles (RPM)	81
Canada Adult Contemporary (RPM)	13

=== Year-end charts ===
Chart (1991)	Peak position
Canada Adult Contemporary (RPM)	90
