= Breathing (Lifehouse song) =

2000 single by Lifehouse

Single by Lifehouse

from the album No Name Face
- B-side: "Trying"
- Released: September 11, 2001
- Genre: Pop rock
- Length: 4:25
- Label: DreamWorks
- Songwriter: Jason Wade
- Producer: Ron Aniello

Lifehouse singles chronology
"Sick Cycle Carousel" (2001)	"Breathing" (2001)	"Spin" (2002)

"Breathing" is a song by American alternative rock band Lifehouse. It was released as the third single released from their debut studio album, No Name Face (2000), on September 11, 2001.

== Background, release and composition ==
The song was written by Lifehouse lead singer Jason Wade and produced by American record producer Ron Aniello. When asked about his expectations of writings songs in an interview with Billboard, Wade said, "My ultimate goal in writing songs is to connect with people. In the lyrics, you don't tell the whole picture: You give a road to start on that people can relate to. We're honest, nice guys and I hope that comes across in everything we do." The song was released on March 19, 2002, by DreamWorks Records.

"Breathing" was described as a pop rock song that contains adult alternative. According to the sheet music published at Musicnotes.com by Sony/ATV Music Publishing, the song is set in common time with a slow tempo of 76 beats per minute. It is composed in the key of D minor with Wade's vocal range spanning from the low-note of A_{3} to the high-note of E_{5}. The song has a basic chord progression of Am–G_{2}–F_{2}–G_{2}. Dave Urbanski of Today's Christian Music questioned whether the lyrics "I'm trying to identify the voices in my head / God, which one's you..." were about God or a girl, but applauded their "skillful musicianship" and "poetic insight". John DiBiase of Jesus Freak Hideout said that the song has catchy rock, but noted how it "tends to find itself getting a little monotonous at times."

== Chart performance ==
"Breathing" had limited commercial success and debuted on the Billboard Adult Pop Songs chart at number 39 for the week of November 10, 2001. It stayed at number 39 the following week, and went up to 37 during the week of November 24, 2001. In its fourth week on the chart, the track climbed to number 36, while it went up to 35 for the week of December 8, 2001. The track then climbed to number 35 and 32 for the weeks of December 15, 2001, and December 22, 2001, respectively. The song then finished 2001 at number 27 for the week of December 29, 2001. For the week of January 12, 2002, the song went up the chart to number 25, while it went up to 24 the following week. "Breathing" then went up to 23 during the week of January 26, 2002 and up to 21 for the week of February 9, 2002. It eventually peaked at number 19 on the chart during the week of February 23, 2002.

== Personnel ==
Personnel are adapted from AllMusic.

- Songwriting – Jason Wade
- Production – Ron Aniello
- Mixing – Brendan O'Brien
- Engineering – Bob Kearny, Marc Green, Paul Hayden

== Track listing ==
- Australian CD single
1. "Breathing" (radio remix) – 4:11
2. "Hanging by a Moment" (acoustic version) – 3:18
3. "Trying" (album version) – 3:51
4. "Breathing" (video) – 4:09

== Charts ==
Chart (2001–2002)	Peak position
US Bubbling Under Hot 100 (Billboard)	15
US Adult Pop Airplay (Billboard)	19
US CHR/Pop Top 50 (Radio & Records)	35
US Hot AC Top 30 (Radio & Records)	18

== Release history ==
Region	Date	Format(s)	Label(s)	Ref.
United States	September 11, 2001	Mainstream rock; active rock radio	DreamWorks	
United States	September 25, 2001	Contemporary hit radio	DreamWorks	
Australia	February 18, 2002	CD	DreamWorks	
