= Billy Jack (disambiguation) =

Billy Jack is a 1971 US action drama independent film. Billy Jack may also refer to:

- Billy Jack (album), by Americana group Honeyhoney
- Billy Jack Haskins, American former football player
- Billy Jack Haynes (born 1953), American retired professional wrestler
- Billy Jack Saucier (1931–1987), American fiddler
- Billy Jack, in the 1971 US action drama independent film Billy Jack, played by Tom Laughlin, and in the 1977 sequel
