= Believe in You (disambiguation) =

"Believe in You" is a song by Jude Cole from the 1995 album I Don't Know Why I Act This Way.

Believe in You may also refer to:

- "Believe in You", a song by Amanda Marshall from the 1999 album Tuesday's Child
- "Believe in You" (Dream song), a song by Dream from the 2001 album Dear...
- "Believe in You", a song by Simon Townshend from the 1985 album Moving Target

== See also ==
- I Believe in You
- I Still Believe in You
