= Worlds Apart (Jude Cole song) =

Single by Jude Cole

from the album Start the Car
- B-side: "First Your Money (Then Your Clothes)"
- Released: 1993
- Length: 3:54
- Label: Reprise
- Songwriters: Jude Cole; Ron Aniello
- Producers: Jude Cole; James Newton Howard

Jude Cole singles chronology
"It Comes Around" (1992)	"Worlds Apart" (1993)	"Believe in You" (1995)

"Worlds Apart" is a song by American singer-songwriter Jude Cole. It was issued by Reprise Records as the third and final single from Cole's third studio album, Start the Car. It was written by Cole and Ron Aniello. This was Cole's last single released on Reprise.

It peaked at No. 37 on the Adult Contemporary chart and No. 23 on the Bubbling Under Hot 100 chart.

== Reception ==
Billboard noted that the track was an acoustic-anchored pop/rocker with rich harmonies and a lively chorus, describing it as “a rollicking entree into the summer” appealing to fans of upbeat melodic rock.

== Track listing ==
All tracks are written by Jude Cole, alongside an additional writer.

No.	Title	Writer(s)	Length
1.	"Worlds Apart"	Cole; Ron Aniello	3:54
2.	"First Your Money (Then Your Clothes)"	Cole; George Green	4:12

== Personnel ==
- Jude Cole – lead vocals, guitar, bass, mandolin
- Pat Mastelotto – drums
- James Newton Howard – keyboards
- Jack Blades – backing vocals
- Tommy Shaw – backing vocals

== Charts ==
Chart (1993)	Peak position
US Bubbling Under Hot 100 (Billboard)	23
US Adult Contemporary (Billboard)	37
