= Paul Conroy =

Paul Conroy may refer to:

- Paul Conroy (music executive) (born 1949), British music executive
- Paul Conroy (Gaelic footballer) (born 1989), Gaelic footballer who plays for Galway
- Paul Conroy (journalist) (1964–2026), British press photographer
- Paul Conroy, a character from the film Buried
