= Starry Eyed =

Starry Eyed may refer to:

- "Starry Eyed" (Michael Holliday song), released in 1960
- "Starry Eyed" (Ellie Goulding song), released in 2010
- "Starry-Eyed", a 2024 episode of American TV series Sugar

== See also ==
- Starry Eyes, a 2014 horror film
- "Starry Eyes", a song by the Records from Shades in Bed
- "Starry Eyes", a song by the Weeknd from Dawn FM
