= Sick Cycle Carousel =

2001 single by Lifehouse

Single by Lifehouse

from the album No Name Face
- Released: April 24, 2001
- Length: 4:23 (album version); 3:59 (edit)
- Label: DreamWorks
- Songwriters: Jason Wade; Scott Faircloff
- Producer: Ron Aniello

Lifehouse singles chronology
"Hanging by a Moment" (2001)	"Sick Cycle Carousel" (2001)	"Breathing" (2001)

"Sick Cycle Carousel" is a song by American alternative rock band Lifehouse. It is the second single released from their debut studio album No Name Face (2000). The track was written by Lifehouse lead singer Jason Wade and Scott Faircloff, who says he felt freedom when writing songs for the album. American record producers Ron Aniello and Brendan O'Brien produced and mixed the song, respectively. The song was released on April 24, 2001, by DreamWorks Records.

The song received positive reviews from critics, who applauded how the producers brought out Wade's vocals over the instrumentation. It managed to chart on the Billboard Modern Rock Tracks chart at number 21. The track later charted in the Netherlands and New Zealand at number 71 and 47, respectively. An official music video for the song premiered on VH1.com on June 27, 2001, featuring effects to make objects look smaller than they really are.

== Background, release and composition ==
"Sick Cycle Carousel"
A sample of "Sick Cycle Carousel" featuring the repetitive main chorus of "This is a sick cycle carousel..." sung by Wade

The song was written by Lifehouse lead singer Jason Wade and was produced by American record producer Ron Aniello. When asked about his experience with making songs for No Name Face in an interview with Billboard, Wade said, "DreamWorks has been amazing in letting us make the record. They're super-artist-friendly. They let us make our record the way we wanted to make it. It's the best label we could be on." In an interview with MTV Radio, Wade explained the message behind "Sick Cycle Carousel" and said, "It's one of those songs I'm really afraid to put an explanation to as far as what it's about for me personally. I don't want it to lose its mystery and mystique. Everyone interprets it differently. It's funny hearing people telling what's it's about to them because then I can go, 'Maybe that's what it's about.' It's got a weird mystique to me still." DreamWorks Records released the song to US radio on April 24, 2001.

According to the sheet music published at Musicnotes.com by Sony/ATV Music Publishing, "Sick Cycle Carousel" is set in common time with a moderate tempo of 92 beats per minute. It is composed in the key of A minor with Wade's vocal range spanning from the low-note of C_{4} to the high-note of G_{5}. The song has a basic chord progression of F–G–Am_{7}–F–G–Am_{7}. John DiBiase of Jesus Freak Hideout called it "a song about the preverbial merry go round we feel like we're on when we keep committing the same sins over and over". Liana Jonas of Allmusic applauded on how Aniello and O'Brien "brought Wade's vocals and lyrics to the forefront of the mix" for all the songs on the album.

== Chart performance ==
"Sick Cycle Carousel" had limited commercial success after the success of Lifehouse's first single, "Hanging by a Moment". The track debuted at number 33 on the Billboard Modern Rock Tracks chart for the week of May 26, 2001. After it spent 12 consecutive weeks on the chart, the song eventually peaked at number 21 for two consecutive weeks. In the Netherlands, the song debuted at number 84 on the Mega Single Top 100 for the week of December 8, 2001, eventually peaking at number 71 after it spent six consecutive weeks on the chart. On the New Zealand Singles Chart, the track debuted at number 50 for the week of August 19, 2001. The song then peaked at number 47 during the week of September 2, 2001, before leaving the chart.

== Music video ==
The scene of the new area from the boy's bed as it shows the stairs that lead up to the light in the music video.

The music video was filmed in June 2001 at an airplane hangar at Los Angeles International Airport and at a Lifehouse show in London. It was directed by Marcos Siega. In an interview with MTV, Wade talked about the idea behind the music video and said, "This is the closest we'll probably ever come to being in a Tim Burton fantasy world. It was done in a real 'Jack and the Beanstalk' style. And Marcos used some camera tricks that make it look amazing. From far away, the stage set looked normal, but when you get closer you get smaller and it gets huge. We were being filmed in front of this bookcase that was like 150 feet high. It's a real visual trip." It premiered on VH1.com on June 27, 2001.

It begins with a shot of Wade's face and the guitar introduction. He then sings the first line of lyrics, which is followed by a transition to a boy lying on a bed shirtless. As the video switches between Wade and the boy, it zooms on the bed frame (which has the same face from the album cover) and opens into another area. The boy is then seen walking around the new area looking around until he goes up nearby stairs. While going up the stairs, the video switches between shots of the boy going up the stairs and Wade singing the lyrics. Once up the stairs, the boy looks around and then walks into a bright light that he sees nearby. He walks through the bright archway into a dark room as the video switches to Lifehouse playing the song. After this, it switches to the boy as he looks up and the camera zooms out to reveal that he is in a giant maze. He then walks back where he came from to find that he is in a house with Lifehouse playing on the television. He then jumps off a window sill and appears tiny as he walks up to a book that is bigger than him. It then transitions to Lifehouse playing the song as the boy gets up on a chair which slowly transcends into his original bed. The video then zooms out on the boy lying on his bed and then switches to the band. It ends with the boy walking into darkness and Wade's face looking on the floor.

== Promotion ==
On January 10, 2001, MTV confirmed that Lifehouse would serve as an opening act on a 14-day tour for Matchbox Twenty, who were promoting their album Mad Season (2000). The tour started February 27, 2001, in Minneapolis and ended on March 29, 2001, in Universal City. In July 2001, Lifehouse went on tour with 3 Doors Down as an opening act on 12 select dates, and performed songs from No Name Face, including "Sick Cycle Carousel". Before they went on tour with 3 Doors Down, the band went on The Tonight Show with Jay Leno on June 25, 2001, and performed "Sick Cycle Carousel".

== Track listings ==
- Australian CD single

No.	Title	Length
1.	"Sick Cycle Carousel" (edit)	3:59
2.	"Hanging by a Moment" (acoustic version)	3:18
3.	"What's Wrong with That"	3:52

- European CD single

No.	Title	Length
1.	"Sick Cycle Carousel" (album version)
2.	"Hanging by a Moment" (acoustic version)
3.	"Trying" (live version)
4.	"Sick Cycle Carousel" (video)

== Credits and personnel ==
Credits and personnel are adapted from AllMusic.

- Songwriting – Jason Wade, Scott Faircloff
- Production – Ron Aniello
- Mixing – Brendan O'Brien
- Engineering – Bob Kearny, Marc Green, Paul Hayden

== Charts ==
=== Weekly charts ===
Weekly chart performance for "Sick Cycle Carousel"
Chart (2001–2002)	Peak position
Australia (ARIA)	79
Canada Rock (Nielsen BDS)	44
Germany (GfK)	93
Netherlands (Dutch Top 40)	28
Netherlands (Single Top 100)	71
New Zealand (Recorded Music NZ)	47
Quebec (ADISQ)	40
US Alternative Airplay (Billboard)	21
US Mainstream Rock (Billboard)	38

=== Year-end charts ===
Year-end chart performance for "Sick Cycle Carousel"
Chart (2001)	Position
US Modern Rock Tracks (Billboard)	79

== Release history ==
Release dates and formats for "Sick Cycle Carousel"
Region	Date	Format(s)	Label(s)	Ref(s).
United States	April 24, 2001	Mainstream rock; active rock; alternative radio	DreamWorks	
Australia	October 15, 2001	CD	DreamWorks	
