= Crashes (album) =

Studio album by The Records
- Released: 13 June 1980
- Recorded: 1979–80
- Studio: AIR Studios, London; Townhouse Studios, London
- Genre: Power pop
- Length: 35:30
- Label: Virgin
- Producer: Craig Leon; Mick Glossop

The Records chronology
Shades in Bed (1979)	Crashes (1980)	Music on Both Sides (1982)

Crashes is the second album by the British power pop band the Records, released in 1980 by Virgin Records.

== Reception ==
Professional ratings
Review scores
Source	Rating
AllMusic	4.5/5 stars
Smash Hits	7½/10

Crashes did not chart in the United Kingdom. In the United States, it "bubbled under" the Billboard 200 album chart at number 204. Rolling Stone published a favourable review of the album upon its initial release.

Retrospectively, Trouser Press called the album a "passable, but hardly a great follow-up" to Shades in Bed.

== Track listing ==
All songs written by Will Birch and John Wicks except where noted.

=== UK release ===
Side one

1. "Rumour Sets the Woods Alight" – 3:02
2. "Hearts in Her Eyes" – 3:20
3. "I Don't Remember Your Name" – 3:35
4. "Man with a Girlproof Heart" (Birch, Richie Bull) – 2:46
5. "The Same Mistakes" – 4:15

Side two

1. "Girl in Golden Disc" – 3:43
2. "Spent a Week with You Last Night" – 3:10
3. "Hearts Will Be Broken" – 3:45
4. "The Worriers" – 3:25
5. "Guitars in the Sky" – 4:05

=== US release ===
Side one

1. "Man with a Girlproof Heart" (Birch, Bull) – 2:47
2. "Hearts Will Be Broken" – 3:52
3. "Girl in Golden Disc" – 3:47
4. "I Don't Remember Your Name" – 3:38
5. "Hearts in Her Eyes" – 3:20

Side two

1. "Spent a Week with You Last Night" – 3:09
2. "Rumour Sets the Woods Alight" – 3:06
3. "The Worriers" – 3:29
4. "The Same Mistakes" – 4:15
5. "Guitars in the Sky" – 4:08

=== 2004 CD release ===
1. "Hearts in Her Eyes" – 3:21
2. "Girl in Golden Disc" – 3:44
3. "Rumour Sets the Woods Alight" – 3:04
4. "I Don't Remember Your Name" – 3:33
5. "The Same Mistakes" – 4:12
6. "Man with a Girlproof Heart" (Birch, Bull) – 2:48
7. "Hearts Will Be Broken" – 3:48
8. "Spent a Week with You Last Night" – 3:11
9. "The Worriers" – 3:28
10. "Guitars in the Sky" – 4:14
11. "Injury Time" – 3:08
12. "Vamp" – 3:11
13. "So Sorry" – 2:50
14. "Faces at the Window" – 3:39
15. "The Same Mistakes" (1979) – 4:00
16. "Man with a Girlproof Heart" (1979) (Birch, Bull) – 3:02

== Personnel ==
- John Wicks – guitar, vocals
- Phil Brown – bass, vocals
- Jude Cole – guitar, vocals
- Will Birch – drums
