= Start the Car =

Studio album by Jude Cole
- Released: August 25, 1992
- Studios: Cherokee (Hollywood); Westlake Audio (Los Angeles); Oceanway (Los Angeles); Capitol Studios (Hollywood); Track Record (North Hollywood); Groove Masters (Santa Monica); Image (Los Angeles)
- Length: 47:33
- Label: Reprise
- Producers: Jude Cole; James Newton Howard

Jude Cole chronology
A View from 3rd Street (1990)	Start the Car (1992)	I Don't Know Why I Act This Way (1995)

Singles from Start the Car
- 1. "Start the Car" Released: 1992; 2. "Tell the Truth" Released: 1992; 3. "Worlds Apart" Released: 1993

Professional ratings
Review scores
Source	Rating
AllMusic	3/5 stars

Start the Car is the third solo album by American singer-songwriter Jude Cole, released by Reprise Records on August 25, 1992. A follow-up to A View from 3rd Street, the album found Cole shifting from pop into a heartland rock sound.

The album peaked at number 177 on the US Billboard 200, number 46 on Australia's ARIA Singles Chart, and number 24 in Sweden. Its lead single of the same name peaked at number 71 on the Billboard Hot 100, number six on the Billboard Album Rock Tracks chart, number 24 in Canada, and number 59 in Australia.

== Track listing ==
All tracks are written by Jude Cole, with additional contributors noted.

No.	Title	Writer(s)	Length
1.	"Start the Car"		5:01
2.	"Worlds Apart"	Ron Aniello	3:54
3.	"Open Road"		5:19
4.	"Just Another Night"		3:47
5.	"Tell the Truth"	James Newton Howard	5:27
6.	"Intro"		0:43
7.	"Right There Now"		5:05
8.	"First Your Money (Then Your Clothes)"	George Green	4:12
9.	"It Comes Around"		4:38
10.	"Blame It on Fate"		4:50
11.	"A Place in the Line"		4:31
Total length:			47:33

== Personnel ==
Adapted from the album's liner notes.

- Jude Cole – vocals, backing vocals (1–5, 7, 9, 11), all guitars (1–4, 6–8, 11), mandolin (1, 2, 7, 8), bass (2, 3, 8), mandocello (3, 6, 7), acoustic guitar (5, 9), electric guitar (5, 9, 10), guitar solo (5, 9, 10), dulcimer (6), marxophone (6), banjo (7), harmonica (8), slide guitar (10)
- Bill Payne – piano (1)
- Marc Greene – Hammond organ (1, 3), keyboards (8)
- James Newton Howard – keyboards (2–4, 6, 7, 9), piano (3, 5, 7, 9, 10), Hammond organ (9), piano solo (11)
- Mike Finnigan – organ (4)
- Robbie Buchanan – programming (5), keyboards (11)
- Kenny Kotwitz – accordion (8)
- Steve Porcaro – keyboards (10)
- David Paich – piano (11)
- Tim Pierce – additional guitars (5)
- Ron Aniello – mandolin (7), additional guitars (10)
- Michael Thompson – additional guitars (9)
- Neil Stubenhaus – bass (1, 4, 9, 10)
- Leland Sklar – bass (5, 7, 11)
- John Robinson – drums (1, 7, 9, 10)
- Pat Mastelotto – drums (2, 4, 11)
- Jeff Porcaro – drums (3, 5)
- Jim Keltner – drums (8)
- Lenny Castro – percussion (1, 5, 9)
- Dan Higgins – horns (1, 10)
- Larry Williams – horns (1, 10)
- Gary Grant – horns (1, 10)
- Jerry Hey – horns (1, 10)
- Richard Greene – violin (8)
- Sass Jordan – female vocals (1)
- Jack Blades – backing vocals (2), harmony vocals (2)
- Tommy Shaw – backing vocals (2), harmony vocals (2)
- Sam Llanas – additional vocals (4)
- John Elefante – backing vocals (5, 10)
- Chuck Sabatino – backing vocals (5, 10)
- Renée Geyer – female vocals (9)
- Robert Parlee – backing vocals (9)
- Phillip Ingram – backing vocals (10)

=== Technical ===
- Produced by Jude Cole and James Newton Howard
- Executive producer – Michael Ostin
- Mixed by Chris Lord-Alge
- Recorded by Marc Greene, Chris Lord-Alge, Bob Schaper, and Erich Gobel
- Additional engineers – Talley Sherwood, Michael Mason, Jason Roberts, Charlie Paakkari, J.J. Jessel, and Mike Gibson
- Production coordination – Julie Larson, Michael Mason, and Kevin Allison
- Guitar technicians – Kevin Allison and Brett Allen
- Art direction – Jeri Heiden
- Cover photography – John Halpern
- Incidental photography – Rick Cole, John Heiden, Jeri Heiden, and Michael Wilson
- Management – Ed Leffler

== Charts ==
Chart (1992)	Peak position
Australian Albums (ARIA)	42
US Billboard 200	177
Swedish Albums (Sverigetopplistan)	24
