= Shades in Bed =

Studio album by The Records
- Released: 18 May 1979
- Recorded: February–April 1979
- Studios: Wessex Sound Studios, London; Townhouse Studios, London
- Genres: Power pop; new wave
- Length: 39:45
- Label: Virgin
- Producers: Robert John "Mutt" Lange; Tim Friese-Greene

The Records chronology
Shades in Bed (1979)	Crashes (1980)

The Records
- US album cover

Shades in Bed (also known as The Records) is the debut album by the British power pop band the Records, released in 1979 by Virgin Records. The album features their best-known song "Starry Eyes."

== Recording and production ==
Recording sessions for the album took place from February to April 1979 at Wessex Sound Studios and Townhouse Studios in London. The first four songs recorded, "Teenarama," "Girls That Don't Exist," "Rock and Roll Love Letter" and a new version of the previously released single "Starry Eyes," were produced by Robert John "Mutt" Lange. Lange could not complete the album due to other commitments so the rest of the album was produced by Tim Friese-Greene. The last song recorded, "The Phone," was a late addition to the album and was produced by Huw Gower. "The Phone" replaced "Rock and Roll Love Letter" which was dropped from the album after it was released as a single in April but was not well received.

== Release and reception ==
Professional ratings
Review scores
Source	Rating
AllMusic	4.5/5 stars
Music Week	2/4 stars
Q	4/5 stars
Smash Hits	6/10
The Village Voice	B−

Shades in Bed was released on 18 May 1979 in the United Kingdom but did not chart.

In the United States, the album was titled The Records and featured a different album cover and track listing. The album version of "Starry Eyes" was replaced with the single version, and the tracks opening each side of the LP were switched. Released on 19 July 1979, the album peaked at No. 41 on the Billboard Top LPs & Tape chart in October 1979. The single "Starry Eyes" was a minor hit, peaking at No. 56 on the Billboard Hot 100 chart. The Records was received positively in publications such as Creem and Trouser Press.

Limited edition UK pressings of the album contained a bonus 12-inch EP titled High Heels featuring four cover songs. In the US the EP was included with the first 25,000 copies of the album as an untitled 7-inch record.

AllMusic called the album "a pure pop masterpiece". Trouser Press called it "a wonderful LP".

The album was released on compact disc in 2002 with 10 bonus tracks. The bonus tracks consisted of the four songs from the bonus EP plus the A and B sides of their first three singles, including the US single version of "Teenarama" remixed by Craig Leon.

== Track listing ==
All songs written by Will Birch and John Wicks except where noted.

=== UK release ===
Side one

1. "Girl" (Birch, Wicks, Phil Brown) – 4:11
2. "Teenarama" – 3:59
3. "Girls That Don't Exist" (Birch, Richie Bull) – 3:38
4. "Starry Eyes" – 4:45
5. "Up All Night" – 4:40

Side two

1. "All Messed Up and Ready to Go" – 3:52
2. "Insomnia" – 3:00
3. "Affection Rejected" (Birch, Wicks, Huw Gower) – 3:52
4. "The Phone" (Gower, Birch) – 3:21
5. "Another Star" – 3:58

=== US release ===
Side one

1. "All Messed Up and Ready to Go" – 3:52
2. "Teenarama" – 3:59
3. "Girls That Don't Exist" (Birch, Richie Bull) – 3:38
4. "Starry Eyes" (single version) – 4:21
5. "Up All Night" – 4:40

Side two

1. "Girl" (Birch, Wicks, Phil Brown) – 4:11
2. "Insomnia" – 3:00
3. "Affection Rejected" (Birch, Wicks, Huw Gower) – 3:52
4. "The Phone" (Gower, Birch) – 3:21
5. "Another Star" – 3:58

=== Bonus EP ===
Side one

1. "Abracadabra (Have You Seen Her)" (Frank Secich, Bill Bartolin) – 2:41
2. "See My Friends" (Ray Davies) – 3:40

Side two

1. "1984" (Randy California) – 3:41
2. "Have You Seen Your Mother Baby (Standing in the Shadow)" (Mick Jagger, Keith Richards) – 2:52

=== CD bonus tracks ===
15. "Starry Eyes" (single version) – 4:23
16. "Paint Her Face" – 3:08
17. "Rock and Roll Love Letter" (Tim Moore) – 3:51
18. "Wives and Mothers of Tomorrow" – 4:15
19. "Held Up High" – 3:33
20. "Teenarama" (remix) – 3:59

== Personnel ==
The Records

- John Wicks – rhythm guitar, vocals
- Huw Gower – lead guitar, vocals
- Phil Brown – bass guitar, vocals
- Will Birch – drums, vocals

Additional musicians

- Ian Gibbons – keyboards
- Jane Aire – vocals on "The Phone"

== Charts ==
Chart (1979)	Peak position
Australian Albums (Kent Music Report)	93
Canada Top Albums/CDs (RPM)	80
Swedish Albums (Sverigetopplistan)	35
US Billboard 200	41
