= Start the Car (song) =

1992 single by Jude Cole

- Australian CD cover

Single by Jude Cole

from the album Start the Car
- B-side: "A Place in the Line"
- Written: 1991
- Released: 1992
- Length: 5:01 (album version); 4:07 (short edit)
- Label: Reprise
- Songwriter: Jude Cole
- Producers: Jude Cole; James Newton Howard

Jude Cole singles chronology
"Compared to Nothing" (1991)	"Start the Car" (1992)	"Tell the Truth" (1992)

"Start the Car" is a song by the American guitarist and singer Jude Cole. It was released in 1992 by Reprise Records, as the lead single from the album of the same name (1992). It was written by Cole and produced by Cole alongside co-producer James Newton Howard. The song peaked at No. 64 and 71 on the US Cash Box Top 100 and Billboard Hot 100 charts, No. 6 on the Billboard Album Rock Tracks chart, and No. 24 on the Canadian RPM 100 Hit Tracks chart.

== Background ==
Cole later explained that he wrote “Start the Car” in 1991 while immersed in classic 1970s soul artists such as Al Green, Marvin Gaye, the Staple Singers, and Roberta Flack. His initial concept was a groove-driven track in the style of Al Green. However, on his drive to the studio, he had Aerosmith’s Pump album playing at high volume, and the powerful transition between “Young Lust” and “F.I.N.E.*” made a strong impression on him. Arriving at James Newton Howard’s studio in the Palisades of Los Angeles for pre-production, Howard suggested shifting the song toward a more rock-oriented approach.

== Reception ==
Billboard magazine described "Start the Car", the title track from Jude Cole's 1992 album of the same name, as a chugging, horn-framed rocker fueled by an instantly catchy chorus and strong guitar/rhythm interplay, predicting that with his 1990 album A View from 3rd Street having quietly produced one delicious pop/rock single after another, this cut held promise of catapulting him beyond his previous top 40 success and straight into the top 10.

== Personnel ==
- Jude Cole – vocals, backing vocals, guitar, mandolin
- Bill Payne – piano
- Marc Greene – Hammond organ
- Neil Stubenhaus – bass guitar
- John Robinson – drums
- Lenny Castro – percussion
- Gary Grant – horns
- Jerry Hey – horns
- Larry Williams – horns
- Daniel Higgins – horns
- Sass Jordan – female vocals

== Charts ==
Chart (1992)	Peak position
Australia (ARIA)	59
Canada Top Singles (RPM)	24
US Billboard Hot 100	71
US Album Rock Tracks (Billboard)	6
US Cash Box Top 100	64

== Travis Tritt version ==
"Start the Car"

Single by Travis Tritt

from the album No More Looking over My Shoulder
- Released: 1999
- Genre: Country, Southern rock
- Length: 4:12
- Label: Warner
- Songwriter: Jude Cole
- Producers: Travis Tritt, Billy Joe Walker Jr.

Travis Tritt singles chronology
"No More Looking Over My Shoulder" (1999)	"Start the Car" (1999)	"Move It On Over" (1999)

In 1998, American country music singer Travis Tritt covered "Start the Car" for his sixth studio album, No More Looking over My Shoulder (1998). His version was the album's third single, charting for ten weeks on the US Billboard Hot Country Songs chart and peaking at number 52, making it Tritt's first single to peak below the top 40 there.

Alanna Nash of Entertainment Weekly called Tritt's cover a "gritty blues version" and considered it an example of Tritt's Southern rock influence.

Chart (1999)	Peak position
US Hot Country Songs (Billboard)	52
Canadian RPM Country Tracks	90
