= Music on Both Sides =

Studio album by the Records
- Released: 11 March 1982
- Genre: Pop, power pop, pop rock
- Label: Virgin
- Producer: Will Birch, Alan Douglas

The Records chronology
Crashes (1980)	Music on Both Sides (1982)	Smashes, Crashes and Near Misses (1988)

Music on Both Sides is the third album by the English band the Records, released on 11 March 1982. They broke up after its release, although some lineups reunited a few times before John Wicks's death.

== Production ==
The songs were written by Will Birch and Wicks. Chris Gent, on vocals, and Dave Whelan, on guitar, joined the band prior to the recording sessions. Paul Carrack contributed to two of the tracks. "Cheap Detective Music" is an instrumental.

== Critical reception ==
Professional ratings
Review scores
Source	Rating
All Music Guide to Rock	3/5 stars
Duluth News Tribune	7/10
The Encyclopedia of Popular Music	3/5 stars
The Fresno Bee	8.5/10
The Great Indie Discography	4/10
Houston Chronicle	2/5 stars
MusicHound Rock: The Essential Album Guide	2.5/5 stars
Omaha World-Herald	3.5/5 stars

The Boston Globe called the album "an appealing and distinctively British pop record, reminiscent of the Hollies in their harder-edged moments." The Omaha World-Herald said that the songs are bright but "the sound is occasionally too thin and spare." Ethlie Ann Vare likewise opined that the "biggest flaw ... is the band's mushy production values ... what the band really needs is the crisp, clean attack of a Mike Chapman or Dave Edmunds at the controls."

The Duluth News Tribune concluded, "Every band reaches a level of competence beyond which they needn't try to reach, and, like the Beatles of 1966 ... the Records are there now." The Houston Chronicle said, "The melodies are uninspired, the structures bland." The Fresno Bee labeled Music on Both Sides a "must" for power pop fans. The Detroit Free Press considered it "radio-perfect pop rock".

== Track listing ==
No.	Title	Length
1.	"Imitation Jewellery"
2.	"Heather and Hell"
3.	"Selfish Love"
4.	"Clown Around Town"
5.	"Not So Much the Time"
6.	"Keeping Up with Jones"
7.	"Third Hand Information"
8.	"Real Life"
9.	"King of Kings"
10.	"Cheap Detective Music"
11.	"Every Day Nightmare"
