= Falling Home =

Falling Home may refer to:

- Falling Home (Jude Cole album), 2000
- Falling Home (Pain of Salvation album), 2014
