= Spin (song) =

2002 single by Lifehouse

Single by Lifehouse

from the album Stanley Climbfall
- Released: July 22, 2002
- Genre: Alternative rock
- Length: 4:51 (album version); 4:09 (radio version)
- Label: DreamWorks
- Songwriters: Jason Wade; Ron Aniello
- Producer: Ron Aniello

Lifehouse singles chronology
"Breathing" (2001)	"Spin" (2002)	"Take Me Away" (2003)

"Spin" is a song by American alternative rock band Lifehouse from their second studio album, Stanley Climbfall (2002). It was written by Jason Wade and produced by Ron Aniello. The song received positive reviews from music critics and peaked at number 71 on the US Billboard Hot 100 chart. It was a top-30 success in New Zealand, reaching number 25 on the RIANZ Singles Chart in January 2003.

== Background ==
"Spin" is four minutes and 52 seconds long. It was produced by Ron Aniello. Jason Wade, the band's vocalist, wrote the song when he was 16.

== Release ==
"Spin" was the first track on Lifehouse's album Stanley Climbfall, which was released on August 17, 2002. It was also the first single from the album.

== Critical reception ==
The song received positive critical reviews. Gene Stout of the Seattle Post-Intelligencer described it as "an anthemic tune with a strong hook and a big guitar sound." Billboard's Chuck Taylor wrote that "'Spin' is a wonderfully constructed rock song with a number of different musical subsections, all of which showcase the potent pipes and song-writing skills of lead singer/guitarist Jason Wade ... Lifehouse has managed to drum up a keen balance between pure, guitar-fueled rock and hook-sodden, creatively executed pop – and this song deserves a lengthy stay on the playlists of both formats."

== Chart performance ==
"Spin" spent 14 weeks on the US Billboard Hot 100 chart and peaked at number 71. The song also peaked at number 13 on the Adult Top 40, number 34 on the Mainstream Rock chart, and number 25 on the Modern Rock Tracks chart. In New Zealand, it peaked at number 25 on the RIANZ Singles Chart in January 2003. It also charted in Australia, Germany, the Netherlands, and the United Kingdom. In the latter country, it debuted and peaked at number five on the UK Rock Chart.

== Music video ==
The song's music video was directed by Dave Meyers and was shot in Los Angeles in August 2002. It features scenes in various people's lives along with performances by the band.

== Charts ==
=== Weekly charts ===
Weekly chart performance for "Spin"
Chart (2002–2003)	Peak position
Australia (ARIA)	57
Germany (GfK)	81
Netherlands (Dutch Top 40 Tipparade)	11
Netherlands (Single Top 100)	93
New Zealand (Recorded Music NZ)	25
Scottish Singles Sales (Official Charts)	77
UK Singles (Official Charts)	77
UK Rock & Metal (Official Charts)	5
US Billboard Hot 100	71
US Adult Pop Airplay (Billboard)	13
US Alternative Airplay (Billboard)	25
US Mainstream Rock (Billboard)	34
US Pop Airplay (Billboard)	28

=== Year-end charts ===
2002 year-end chart performance for "Spin"
Chart (2002)	Position
US Adult Top 40 (Billboard)	73

2003 year-end chart performance for "Spin"
Chart (2003)	Position
US Adult Top 40 (Billboard)	43

== Release history ==
Release dates and formats for "Spin"
Region	Date	Format(s)	Label(s)	Ref.
United States	July 22, 2002	Mainstream rock; active rock; alternative radio	DreamWorks	
United States	September 3, 2002	Contemporary hit; hot AC; triple A radio	DreamWorks	
Australia	September 23, 2002	CD	DreamWorks	
