= Jude Cole =

American singer, songwriter, guitarist, and record producer (born 1960)

- Born: Jude Anthony Cole; June 18, 1960 (age 66); Carbon Cliff, Illinois, U.S.
- Genres: Blue-eyed soul; pop; rock
- Occupations: Singer; songwriter; guitarist; record producer; record executive; talent manager
- Instruments: Guitar; vocals; bass
- Years active: 1978–present
- Labels: Warner Bros.; Reprise; Island; Ironworks
- Formerly of: The Records
- Spouse: Lori Pfeiffer (m. 1993)
- Children: 2
- Website: https://JudeCole.com/

Jude Anthony Cole (born June 18, 1960) is an American singer, songwriter, guitarist, record producer, and talent manager from Carbon Cliff, Illinois. He began his career as part of Moon Martin's backing group the Ravens, and joined the English power pop band the Records in 1980, by the age of 19. After his work on their album Crashes (1980), he signed with Reprise Records to pursue a solo recording career and released his eponymous debut studio album (1987), which was followed by four subsequent releases—A View from 3rd Street (1990), Start the Car (1992), I Don't Know Why I Act This Way (1995), and Falling Home (2000). Afterward, he outsourced his work onto management, production, and songwriting for the alternative rock band Lifehouse. Cole was credited on most of their singles throughout the 2000s, including "You and Me", "First Time", "Whatever It Takes" and "Halfway Gone"—each became hit songs on the Billboard Hot 100, Mainstream Top 40, Adult Top 40, and Adult Contemporary charts.

He co-founded the Ironworks record label in 2003 along with actor and business partner Kiefer Sutherland. Lifehouse signed with the label in 2013 to release their seventh album, Out of the Wasteland (2015).

== Career ==
After spending two years as guitarist and backing vocalist for Moon Martin and The Ravens, Cole joined English pop band The Records as a guitarist for their second album, Crashes, in 1980. When the band returned to Britain, Cole remained in the United States to pursue a solo recording career.

His first three solo albums, Jude Cole (1987), A View from 3rd Street (1990), and Start the Car (1992) were released by Reprise Records and featured a lighthearted, romance-inspired pop sound in an adult contemporary format. The albums were met with minimal domestic success, although A View from 3rd Street yielded the single "Baby, It's Tonight", which peaked at number 16 on the Billboard Hot 100. Other singles, such as "Time for Letting Go", "House Full of Reasons", "Start the Car", and "Tell the Truth" also moderately entered the chart. During this time, Cole was commissioned to contribute to the soundtrack for commercially successful films including Where the Boys Are '84 (1984), The Karate Kid Part III (1989), Last Light (1993), Navy SEALs (1990), and Back to School (1986). He performed the titular theme song for the latter, which became one of Cole's most popular songs. His fourth album, I Don't Know Why I Act This Way, was released by Island Records in 1995, while his fifth album Falling Home was released by his own label, Watertown Records, in 2000.

That same year, Cole halted his recording career to manage the alternative rock band Lifehouse, for DreamWorks Records, as well as singer Lindsay Pagano for Warner Records. He chose Irving Azoff as a business partner, and spent the next four years working on behalf of his company, Azoff Management.

In 2003, Cole and business partner, actor Kiefer Sutherland launched Ironworks Studio and its namesake record label (rebranded from Watertown Records), which would go on to sign musical acts including Billy Boy on Poison, Ron Sexsmith, and honeyhoney. In 2005, Cole contributed segments for the entertainment television program Extra as music critic, where he interviewed high-profile acts including the Rolling Stones, Alice Cooper, and Bob Seger. That same year, Cole oversaw Lifehouse's notable shift in musical direction, as he helmed executive producer duties for the band's eponymous third studio album. The band received one of their furthest commercial successes from its lead single, "You and Me", which Cole co-produced and co-wrote. With Cole sharing a similar role for their subsequent releases, Lifehouse signed to his Ironworks label upon parting ways with Geffen Records in 2013.

In 2016, Cole co-wrote and produced the entirety of Kiefer Sutherland's debut album, Down in a Hole, which marked the actor's first effort as a country singer. Cole contributed in a similar role, as well as engineering duties to its follow-up, Reckless & Me (2019); this album included a cover of Cole's song "Open Road" from his 1992 album, Start the Car.

On January 20, 2021, Cole returned to his recording career with his sixth album Coup De Main, his first in 20 years. The album consists of nine tracks and was made available on all streaming platforms. He later released a cover album, Coolerator, on July 27 of that same year.

== Personal life ==
Cole was married to Lori Pfeiffer (born 1965), the younger sister of actress Michelle Pfeiffer, with whom he has two sons.

== Discography ==
=== Albums ===
Title	Album details	Peak chart positions			
Title	Album details	US	AUS	CAN	SWE
Jude Cole	Release date: 1987; Label: Warner Bros.	—	—	—	—
A View from 3rd Street	Release date: March 27, 1990; Label: Reprise	138	—	35	—
Start the Car	Release date: August 25, 1992; Label: Reprise	177	46	—	24
I Don't Know Why I Act This Way	Release date: September 25, 1995; Label: Island	—	—	—	—
Falling Home	Release date: September 1, 2000; Label: Watertown	—	—	—	—
Coup De Main	Release date: January 19, 2021	—	—	—	—
Coolerator	Release date: July 27, 2021	—	—	—	—
"—" denotes releases that did not chart

=== Singles ===
Year	Single	US	US Main. Rock	US R&R Pop	AUS
1990	"Baby, It's Tonight"	16	3	10	106
1990	"Time for Letting Go"	32	33	22	118
1990	"House Full of Reasons"	69	—	69	—
1992	"Start the Car"	71	6	31	59
1992	"Tell the Truth"	57	—	25	—
1993	"It Comes Around"	—	19	—	—
1993	"Worlds Apart"	—	—	58	—
1995	"Believe in You"	—	—	—	—

=== Musical credits ===
- Moon Martin – Escape from Domination 1979 – guitar, background vocals (Capitol)
- Moon Martin – Street Fever 1980 – guitar, background vocals, songwriter (Capitol)
- The Records – Crashes 1980 – co-lead singer, lead guitarist (Virgin)
- Moon Martin – Mystery Ticket 1981 – songwriter (Capitol)
- Peter Noone – Solo Record 1981 – background vocals, guitar (Pasha/Columbia)
- Billy Thorpe – East of Eden's Gate 1982 – background vocals (Pasha)
- Dave Edmunds – D.E. 7th 1982 – songwriter (Columbia)
- Ted Nugent – Ted Nugent 1982 – background vocals (Epic)
- Patrick Simmons – Arcade 1983 – guitar (Electra)
- Del Shannon – Drop Down and Get Me 1983 – background vocals, guitar (London)
- Soundtrack – Where the Boys Are '84 1984 – songwriter, artist (MCA)
- Soundtrack – Back to School 1986 – artist (MCA)
- Jude Cole (self-titled) 1987 (Warner Bros)
- Soundtrack – Karate Kid III 1988 – songwriter, artist
- Lisa Hartman – Till My Heart Stops 1988 – songwriter (Atlantic)
- Jude Cole – A View from 3rd Street 1990 (Reprise)
- Jude Cole – Start the Car 1992 (Reprise)
- Marc Bonilla – American Matador 1993 – songwriter (Reprise)
- Jude Cole – I Don't Know Why I Act This Way 1995 (Island)
- Paola Turci – Oltre Le Nuvole (1997) producer, guitar, background vocals (Warner Bros. Italy)
- Soundtrack – Truth or Consequences, NM (1998) composer
- Jewel – Spirit 1998 – guitars, background vocals (Atlantic)
- Travis Tritt – No More Looking over My Shoulder 1998 – guitar, songwriter (Warner Bros)
- Billie Myers – Vertigo 1999 – guitar
- Kendall Payne – Jordan's Sister 1999 – guitar, background vocals (Capitol)
- Clay Davidson – Unconditional 2000 – producer, guitar, background vocals (Virgin Nashville)
- Jude Cole – Falling Home 2000 (Watertown)
- Lifehouse – No Name Face 2000 – manager, songwriter (DreamWorks)
- Lindsay Pagano – Love & Faith & Inspiration 2001 – manager, songwriter, producer, musician (Warner Brothers)
- Lifehouse – Stanley Climbfall 2002 – manager (DreamWorks)
- Styx – Cyclorama 2003 – background vocals (Sanctuary)
- Soundtrack, Beth Orton – Warchild 2003 – producer (Astralwerks)
- Soundtrack, Beth Orton – How to Deal 2004 – producer (Capitol)
- Lifehouse – Lifehouse 2005 – manager, songwriter (Geffen)
- Mozella – I Will 2006 – producer, songwriter, musician (Maverick)
- Rocco Deluca & The Burden – I Trust You to Kill Me 2006 – manager, producer, songwriter (Ironworks)
- Leigh Nash – Blue on Blue 2006 – songwriter
- Lifehouse – Who We Are 2007 – manager, producer, songwriter, musician (Interscope/Geffen)
- honeyhoney – Loose Boots (EP) 2008 – producer (Ironworks)
- honeyhoney – First Rodeo 2009 – producer (Ironworks/Universal Republic)
- Jim Stapley – Love Is Surrender (EP) 2010 – producer, songwriter, musician (Ironworks)
- Lifehouse – Smoke & Mirrors 2010 – manager, co-producer, songwriter, musician (Interscope/Geffen)
- Rhett Miller – The Dreamer 2012 – songwriter "I'll Try To"
- Lifehouse – Almería 2013 – manager, co-producer, songwriter, musician (Interscope/Geffen)
- One Ok Rock – 35xxxv 2014 – producer, co-writer of song "Fight The Night"
- Lifehouse – "Hurricane" 2014 – producer, co-writer of first single from forthcoming album
- Lifehouse – Out of the Wasteland 2015 – producer, cowriter, manager
- Kiefer Sutherland – Down in a Hole 2016 – writer, producer, musicians, engineer"
- Kiefer Sutherland – Reckless & Me 2019 – writer, producer, musician, engineer"
