= 3 (honeyhoney album) =

Studio album by honeyhoney
- Released: June 9, 2015
- Genres: Americana, indie rock, country
- Length: 46:48
- Label: Rounder
- Producer: Dave Cobb

Honeyhoney chronology
Billy Jack (2011)	3 (2015)

Professional ratings
Review scores
Source	Rating
American Songwriter	3.5/5 stars
Glide Magazine	7/10 stars
PopMatters	7/10 stars

3 is honeyhoney's third album, released June 9, 2015 and was produced by Dave Cobb. The website American Songwriter reviewed it writing, "with a singer-songwriter that exudes the magnetic passion and swaggering star power of Santo, this is a group whose time has come."

== Track list ==
All tracks are written by Ben Jaffe and Suzanne Santo

No.	Title	Length
1.	"Big Man"	3:23
2.	"Yours to Bear"	4:37
3.	"Back to You"	3:32
4.	"Whatchya Gonna Do Now"	4:09
5.	"Numb It"	3:29
6.	"Bad People"	3:34
7.	"Burned Me Out"	4:14
8.	"You and I"	3:44
9.	"Father's Daughter"	4:03
10.	"God of Love"	3:54
11.	"Sweet Thing"	3:13
12.	"Marry Rich"	4:56

== Charts ==
Chart (2015)	Peak position
US Top Heatseekers	7
US Billboard Folk Albums	10
