= Reckless & Me =

Studio album by Kiefer Sutherland
- Released: April 26, 2019
- Genre: Country
- Length: 39:11
- Label: BMG
- Producer: Jude Cole

Kiefer Sutherland chronology
Down in a Hole (2016)	Reckless & Me (2019)	Bloor Street (2022)

Singles from Reckless & Me
- 1. "Open Road" Released: December 21, 2018; 2. "This Is How It's Done" Released: March 8, 2019; 3. "Something You Love" Released: March 15, 2019; 4. "Faded Pair of Jeans" Released: April 5, 2019

Reckless & Me is the second studio album by actor and musician Kiefer Sutherland. The album was released on April 26, 2019.

== Background ==
About the release of the album, in an interview, Sutherland said: "I asked myself? What is the thing that I love about acting and music? What is the common denominator? For me it's storytelling and music is a very different way of doing it".

The first single from the album, "Open Road", was released on December 21, 2018. The second single, "This Is How It's Done", was released on March 8, 2019. The third and fourth singles, "Something You Love" and "Faded Pair of Blue Jeans", were released on March 15, 2019, and April 5, 2019, respectively.

== Track listing ==
No.	Title	Writer(s)	Length
1.	"Open Road"	Jude Cole	4:42
2.	"Something You Love"	Cole; Jason Wade; Kiefer Sutherland	3:51
3.	"Faded Pair of Blue Jeans"	Cole; Wade	3:45
4.	"Reckless and Me"	Cole; Sutherland	4:08
5.	"Blame It on Your Heart"	Harlan Howard; Kostas	3:35
6.	"This Is How It's Done"	Sutherland; Cole	3:23
7.	"Agave"	Cole; Sammy Hagar; Sutherland	3:45
8.	"Run to Him"	Cole	4:42
9.	"Saskatchewan"	Sutherland; Cole	4:22
10.	"Song for a Daughter"	Sutherland	2:58
Total length:			39:11

== Personnel ==
- Jude Cole – production, engineering, composition
- Chris Lord-Alge – engineering, mixing
- Dave Way - engineering
- Clayton Cooper – photography, graphic design

== Charts ==
Chart (2019)	Peak position
Austrian Albums (Ö3 Austria)	75
German Albums (Offizielle Top 100)	28
Scottish Albums (Official Charts)	3
Swiss Albums (Schweizer Hitparade)	62
UK Albums (Official Charts)	9
UK Country Albums (Official Charts)	1
