= The Records =

English power pop band

- Origin: United Kingdom
- Genres: New wave; power pop
- Years active: 1978–1982
- Label: Virgin
- Spinoff of: The Kursaal Flyers
- Past members: Will Birch; John Wicks; Phil Brown; Huw Gower; Jude Cole; Dave Whelan; Chris Gent
- Website: therecords.com

The Records were an English power pop band formed in 1978. They are best remembered for the hit single and cult favourite "Starry Eyes".

== Music career ==
The Records formed out of the ashes of the Kursaal Flyers, a pub rock group featuring drummer Will Birch. In 1977, John Wicks joined the band as a rhythm guitarist, and he and Birch quickly started writing songs together, Wicks as composer, Birch as lyricist. The Kursaal Flyers dissolved three months after Wicks joined, but he and Birch continued to write songs together with the hopes of starting a new four-piece group with Birch on drums and Wicks on lead vocals and rhythm guitar. Birch soon came up with a name for the formative band: The Records. The group's line-up initially included bassist Phil Brown and lead guitarist Brian Alterman, whose guitar riffs have been compared to those of the Byrds. Alterman played on two early demos that were later included on the album Paying for the Summer of Love, before joining another band. Alterman was replaced by Huw Gower in 1978. Like Birch and Wicks, Gower and Brown were music veterans: Gower had played with a band called the Ratbites from Hell, and Brown had been the bass player for the Janets.

The new group was heavily influenced both by bands like the Beatles and the Kinks, and early power pop groups such as Badfinger, Big Star, and Raspberries. Power pop was experiencing a renaissance on both sides of the Atlantic, thanks in large part to the burgeoning punk/new wave movement.

They were hired to back Stiff Records singer Rachel Sweet on the "Be Stiff Tour '78". The Records opened the shows with a set of their own. Birch and Wicks also wrote a song for Sweet's debut album entitled Pin a Medal on Mary. The songwriting duo also penned "Hearts in Her Eyes" for the Searchers, who made an unexpected comeback with their power pop oriented album The Searchers in 1979.

Based on their demos (later released as Paying for the Summer of Love), the band was signed to Virgin Records in 1978. Their debut single, "Starry Eyes", was released in the UK that December and has since become their best-known song, and an oft-covered power pop standard. AllMusic called it "a near-perfect song that defined British power pop in the '70s". Due in part to its clear influence by American power pop, the song was a bigger hit in the US than in the UK; it peaked at No. 56 on the Billboard Hot 100 in October 1979.

=== Shades in Bed ===
The group prepared their debut album with producers Robert John "Mutt" Lange and Tim Friese-Greene. Huw Gower produced "The Phone", which was added to the album in preference to one of Lange's efforts, a cover of Tim Moore's "Rock 'n' Roll Love Letter". The debut LP, Shades in Bed, yielded another single, "Teenarama", their second-best known song. The album was released in the US in July 1979 as The Records with different song sequencing and with the original single version of "Starry Eyes" replacing Lange's re-recording that appeared on the UK edition. The album was sufficiently well received to peak on the Billboard chart at No. 41. Gower also produced the bonus four track disc of cover tunes included in the album release, which also received FM airplay, notably the version of Spirit's "1984", which was strong enough to become short-listed by Virgin as the second single off the album.

That was the pinnacle of their success. Returning to the UK, Will Birch engaged the services of producer Craig Leon to record two new songs and to remix two tracks from Shades in Bed for a possible single release. Huw Gower acted as co-producer. After an aborted German tour with Robert Palmer, Gower left the band and relocated to New York, where he joined forces with New York Dolls lead singer David Johansen. Their collaboration led to the successful album Live It Up.

=== Crashes ===
Jude Cole, a 19-year-old American, who had been in Moon Martin's backing group The Ravens, joined for the album Crashes (1980). The album was not a hit, and did not yield any successful singles, and record company support for the band dried up during the Crashes tour. Cole stayed in the US, while the core of Birch, Wicks and Brown returned home to England.

=== Music on Both Sides ===
The trio expanded into a quintet with guitarist Dave Whelan and lead singer Chris Gent. Previously, most of the songs had been sung by Wicks, but with other members frequently taking lead vocals for individual songs. Birch has since declared that the decision to recruit a lead singer was made "perhaps unwisely". This line-up recorded a third album for Virgin, 1982's Music on Both Sides. Like its predecessor, the album was not a hit.

=== Breakup and aftermath ===
After this, the band effectively broke up. Birch turned to tour managing, running 'Rock Tours', a sightseeing London Bus venture, producing and writing. In 1990, the original band briefly reformed to contribute a track for the 1991 Brian Wilson tribute album, Smiles, Vibes & Harmony. Birch, Brown and Wicks cut the basic track for "Darlin'" in London; Gower added his parts and mixed it in New York. The same year also saw the US release of Paying for the Summer of Love. Both recordings received great press, but were not enough to outweigh unresolved past issues within the core membership, which effectively killed any possibility of restarting the group. Wicks relocated to the US in 1994 and was writing, recording and performing both solo and with a new incarnation of the band up until 2018.

Brown died on 2 February 2012 following an undisclosed degenerative illness. Wicks died following a year-long struggle with cancer on 7 October 2018 in Burbank, California.

== Discography ==
Beginning with their debut album – Shades in Bed (1979, UK), retitled in the US as simply The Records – releases by The Records have been issued in a variety of editions:

=== Albums ===
- 1979: Shades in Bed
- 1980: Crashes
- 1982: Music on Both Sides
- 1988: Smashes, Crashes and Near Misses
- 1989: A Sunny Afternoon in Waterloo (Germany)
- 1998: Rock'Ola (Spain)
- 2001: Paying for the Summer of Love (US)
- 2009: Play Live: The Records Live in Concert (Japan)

=== Singles ===
- 1978: "Starry Eyes" (UK)
- 1979: "Rock 'n' Roll Love Letter" (UK)
- 1979: "Starry Eyes" (US)
- 1979: "Teenarama"
- 1980: "Hearts in Her Eyes"
- 1982: "Imitation Jewellery"
