= First Rodeo =

Studio album by honeyhoney
- Released: November 4, 2008
- Genres: Americana, alternative country
- Length: 33:59
- Label: Ironworks
- Producers: Jude Cole, Aaron Embry, honeyhoney

Honeyhoney chronology
| Loose Boots (2008) | First Rodeo (2008) | Billy Jack (2011) |

Professional ratings
Review scores
| Source | Rating |
|---|---|
| Glide Magazine | 8/10 stars |

First Rodeo is honeyhoney's debut album, released on November 4, 2008, under the now-defunct Ironworks record label, run by actor Kiefer Sutherland and friend Jude Cole. Sutherland directed and starred in the group's music video for their song "Little Toy Gun".

== Track listing ==
All tracks are written by Ben Jaffe and Suzanne Santo

| No. | Title | Length |
|---|---|---|
| 1. | "Black Crows" | 3:25 |
| 2. | "Little Toy Gun" | 2:38 |
| 3. | "Sugarcane" | 3:18 |
| 4. | "Not for Long" | 3:05 |
| 5. | "Bouncing Ball" | 3:50 |
| 6. | "Come on Home" | 4:10 |
| 7. | "Give Yourself to Me" | 2:33 |
| 8. | "David" | 2:40 |
| 9. | "Slow Brains" | 3:09 |
| 10. | "Under the Willow Tree" | 2:41 |
| 11. | "Oh Mama" | 2:30 |
