= Jude Cole (album) =

Studio album by Jude Cole
- Released: 1987
- Studios: Unique Recording Studios (New York City); Greene St. Recording (New York City); The Sandbox Studios (Easton)
- Genre: Pop rock
- Length: 45:38
- Label: Warner Bros.
- Producer: Russ Titelman

Jude Cole chronology
Jude Cole (1987)	A View from 3rd Street (1990)

Professional ratings
Review scores
Source	Rating
AllMusic	link

Jude Cole is the debut album by American singer-songwriter Jude Cole. The album is one of the first to feature tenor saxophonist Kenny G, who performs on two tracks.

== Track listing ==
All tracks are written by Jude Cole, with additional writers noted.

No.	Title	Writer(s)	Length
1.	"Like Lovers Do"		4:42
2.	"Walls That Bend"	John Corey	3:45
3.	"You Were in My Heart"		5:00
4.	"Something That You Want"	Alan Pasqua	4:21
5.	"Life of Luxury"	Corey, Debrah Neal	4:36
6.	"The Hurt"		4:36
7.	"Everyone's in Love"	Sara Allen	4:23
8.	"Better Days"	John Bettis	3:58
9.	"Walk on Water"		4:05
10.	"Crying Mary"		6:12
Total length:			45:38

== Personnel ==
Adapted from the album's liner notes.

- Jude Cole – lead vocals, backing vocals (1–6, 8–10), guitars, bass (1, 2, 4–9), acoustic guitar (10)
- Rob Mounsey – keyboards (1, 3, 4, 7, 10)
- Jeff Bova – keyboards (2, 5)
- Robby Kilgore – synth bass (3, 10), keyboards (6, 7), synthesizers (9), Hammond B3 (9)
- Ron Skies – synthesizer programming (3)
- Russ Titelman – synthesizer arrangement (3)
- Mickey Curry – drums
- Jimmy Bralower – drum programming
- Jimmy Maelen – percussion (2–4, 7, 9)
- Kenny G – tenor saxophone (3, 5)
- Reggie Griffin – guitar solo (4), keyboard solo (7)
- Eric Weissberg – mandolin (10)
- Frank Simms – backing vocals (2, 9)
- Lani Groves – backing vocals (2, 4)
- Mark Stevens – backing vocals (4)
- John Oates – backing vocals (7)
- Jill Dell'Abate – backing vocals (8)

=== Technical ===
- Produced by Russ Titelman
- Engineered by Chris Lord-Alge, Brad Leigh, and Ron Bach
- Mixed by Neil Dorfsman
- Mastered by Ted Jensen at Sterling Sound, N.Y.
- Additional engineers – Neil Dorfsman, Rod Hui, Tom Lord-Alge, Acar Key, Malcolm Pollack, and Larry Alexander
- Assistant engineers – Mike Webber, Mike Harlow, Steve Satkowski, Angela Piva, Jeff Lord-Alge
- Mix-down assistant – Acar Key
- Production coordinator – Jill Dell'Abate
- Art direction & design – Jeri McManus Heiden
- Photography – Timothy White
- Management – Denis Pregnolato/Anonymous Management
