= Tell the Truth (Jude Cole song) =

Single by Jude Cole

from the album Start the Car
- B-side: "It Comes Around"
- Released: 1992
- Length: 5:27 (album version); 4:16 (single edit)
- Label: Reprise
- Songwriters: Jude Cole; James Newton Howard
- Producers: Jude Cole; James Newton Howard

Jude Cole singles chronology
"Start the Car" (1992)	"Tell the Truth" (1992)	"It Comes Around" (1992)

"Tell the Truth" is a song by the American musician Jude Cole from his third album, Start the Car (1992). It was written and produced by Cole and James Newton Howard, and was released in 1992 by Reprise Records, as the second single from the album. The song peaked at numbers 54 and 57 on the US Cash Box Top 100 and Billboard Hot 100 charts. It also became his fifth and final entry on the charts.

== Reception ==
Billboard magazine described "Tell the Truth" as "a contagious, acoustic-anchored rock ballad from Cole's stellar Start the Car album," adding that "Cole is one of those artists who can deliver near-perfect pop tunes with little to no grandstanding," and expressed hope that the song "will find its way onto Pop and AC playlists, making him the major star he deserves to be."

== Personnel ==
- Jude Cole – vocals, backing vocals, acoustic guitar, electric guitar, guitar solo
- James Newton Howard – acoustic piano
- Leland Sklar – bass guitar
- Jeff Porcaro – drums
- Tim Pierce – additional guitars
- Lenny Castro – percussion
- Robbie Buchanan – programming
- John Elefante – backing vocals
- Chuck Sabatino – backing vocals

== Charts ==
Chart (1993)	Peak position
Canada Top Singles (RPM)	36
US Billboard Hot 100	57
US Adult Contemporary (Billboard)	19
US Cash Box Top 100	54
