= Benjamin Jaffe =

American musician and songwriter

- Born: Williamstown, Massachusetts, U.S.
- Genres: Americana; Alternative country; Folk
- Occupations: Musician; Singer-songwriter; Composer
- Instruments: Guitar; Drums; Flute; Vocals
- Years active: 2006–present
- Website: benjaffemusic.com

Benjamin Jaffe is an American musician and singer-songwriter based in Los Angeles. He co-founded the Americana duo honeyhoney with Suzanne Santo in 2006, released his solo debut album Oh, Wild Ocean of Love in 2018, and has toured as a guitarist and backing vocalist with Kacey Musgraves since 2021. He has also composed music for short films and co-written songs for television.

== Early life ==
Jaffe was born in Williamstown, Massachusetts. He attended Mount Greylock Regional School, graduating in 2003, and was named an all-state drummer. He began studying music at age six, starting on violin before moving to drums, and took drum lessons from the jazz drummer Randy Kaye. He moved to Los Angeles at age 18 and, apart from a two-year period in Nashville, Tennessee, has lived there since.

== Career ==
=== honeyhoney ===
In his early years in Los Angeles, the songwriter and producer Andrew Paley arranged session work for Jaffe, and through the composer Ned Albright he first recorded his own songs professionally. He also worked with producer Todd Averback on a project called Black Tie Society, writing material for other artists and for television. Jaffe met Santo in 2006. The pair first performed as Zanzibar Lewis and, under that name, won a local band contest co-sponsored by Ironworks Music, the label founded by producer Jude Cole and actor Kiefer Sutherland. Renamed honeyhoney, they released their debut album on Ironworks.

The duo released the Loose Boots EP and the album First Rodeo in 2008, followed by Billy Jack (2011) and 3 (2015), the last produced by Dave Cobb. Rolling Stone included the duo in its 2015 country music preview. After 3, honeyhoney went on hiatus; Santo recorded and toured with Butch Walker and released a solo album, while Jaffe began work on his own material.

=== Solo work ===
Jaffe released his debut solo album, Oh, Wild Ocean of Love, a ten-song set, on May 11, 2018, on Diamond Family Records. He played most of the instruments and co-produced the record with Howard Feibusch and Erik Kertes. Billboard wrote that the album departed from honeyhoney's Americana, with moodier, more textural songs and fuller instrumentation. Jaffe accompanied the record with The Rearranger Series, videos presenting its songs in markedly different arrangements.

He followed it with Enlightenment with Bill.E (2023), credited to Benjamin Jaffe & A Gifted Community, and Songs for Agreement in 2026.

=== Film and television ===
Jaffe composed the score for the short film Joy Joy Nails, which had its world premiere at the 2017 Tribeca Film Festival. In 2017, honeyhoney became the house band on The Guest Book, a TBS anthology comedy series created by Greg Garcia. They wrote an original song and recorded a cover for each episode, for use as its closing music, and appeared on screen in recurring roles. Jaffe and Santo are the credited writers of the show's main title theme, "Fine By Me".

Jaffe composed the music for the short film Beatrix Is Invisible, which won the Audience Award for Best Live-Action Short at the 2025 Palm Springs International ShortFest. His song "Chain of Need" was used in the first season of the Amazon Prime Video series Off Campus in 2026.

=== Touring with Kacey Musgraves ===
In 2021, Jaffe joined Kacey Musgraves's touring band, playing guitar and singing backing vocals; he was recruited by the band's musical director, Drew Taubenfeld. He appeared with Musgraves on Saturday Night Live in October 2021 and on Austin City Limits in 2024. He also performs the flute part on "There Is a Light", originally recorded by the session musician Jim Hoke.

== Discography ==
=== Solo ===
Year	Title
2018	Oh, Wild Ocean of Love
2023	Enlightenment with Bill.E (as Benjamin Jaffe & A Gifted Community)
2026	Songs for Agreement

=== With honeyhoney ===
Year	Title
2008	Loose Boots (EP)
2008	First Rodeo
2011	Billy Jack
2015	3

== Sources ==
- Bialas, Michael (May 11, 2018). "Benjamin Jaffe Dives Into 'Oh, Wild Ocean of Love' While HoneyHoney Take Deep Breath". PopMatters.
- Carroll, Felix (March 4, 2022). "On a break from a world tour, Benjamin Jaffe will join old friends at The Egremont Barn". The Berkshire Eagle.
- McGee, David (March 2009). "'There's No Wrong Note': Opposites Attract, And honeyhoney Settles In For a Long Run". The Bluegrass Special. Archived from the original on October 9, 2026.
- "Benjamin Jaffe Opens Up at Union Pool". Pancakes and Whiskey. November 16, 2017. Archived from the original on January 18, 2026.
- Graff, Gary (March 1, 2018). "HoneyHoney's Benjamin Jaffe Shares 'Susan the Cat,' Based on a 'Really Weird' Feline: Premiere". Billboard.
- "Interview with Ben Jaffe". Loud Hailer Magazine. 2023.
- "Joy Joy Nails". Tribeca Festival. 2017. Archived from the original on October 9, 2026.
- Topel, Fred (August 16, 2017). "How a Hotel Guest Book Prank Inspired the Creator of 'My Name Is Earl' to Create His New Comedy [Interview]". /Film.
- "Fine By Me". Songview (ASCAP Repertory Search). ASCAP / BMI. ISWC T9230834498.
- Leahey, Andrew (January 9, 2015). "2015 Country Music Preview: 20 Reasons to Love This Year". Rolling Stone.
- Paul, Larisha (August 14, 2024). "Kacey Musgraves Delivers Tender 'Too Good to Be True' Performance on 'Austin City Limits'". Rolling Stone.
- "Taping Recap: Kacey Musgraves". Austin City Limits. June 4, 2024. Archived from the original on October 12, 2026.
- "Beatrix Is Invisible". Palm Springs International ShortFest. 2025.
- "Benjamin Jaffe artist page". Diamond Family Records. 2026.
- Craig, David (May 13, 2026). "Off Campus soundtrack: Every song featured in Prime Video's romantic drama". Radio Times.
- Gomez, Dessi (May 14, 2026). "All The Songs in 'Off Campus' Season 1: From Role Model To Lady Gaga". Deadline.
