= House Full of Reasons =

Single by Jude Cole

from the album A View from 3rd Street
- B-side: "Baby, It's Tonight"; "Time for Letting Go"; "Get Me Through the Night"
- Released: November 7, 1990
- Recorded: 1989
- Genre: Progressive rock
- Length: 3:56
- Label: Reprise
- Songwriter: Jude Cole
- Producer: David Tyson

Jude Cole singles chronology
"Time for Letting Go" (1990)	"House Full of Reasons" (1990)	"Compared to Nothing" (1991)

"House Full of Reasons" is a song by American singer-songwriter Jude Cole, released on November 7, 1990 by Reprise Records, as the third and final single from his second studio album, A View from 3rd Street. (1990). The lyrics describe the protagonist (Cole) reminiscing on a failed relationship, struggling to move on from the emotional wreckage. The song peaked at numbers 59 and 69 on the US Cash Box Top 100 and Billboard Hot 100 charts, and number 42 on the Billboard Adult Contemporary chart.

== Personnel ==
- Jude Cole – vocals, backing vocals, guitars, bass
- David Tyson – keyboards, piano, organ, harmonium, drum programming
- Pat Mastelotto – drums, percussion

== Charts ==
Chart (1991)	Peak position
Canada Top Singles (RPM)	34
Canada Adult Contemporary (RPM)	31
US Billboard Hot 100	69
US Adult Contemporary (Billboard)	42
US Cash Box Top 100	59
