= Time for Letting Go =

1990 single by Jude Cole

Single by Jude Cole

from the album A View from 3rd Street
- B-side: "Prove Me Wrong"
- Released: July 19, 1990
- Recorded: 1989
- Genre: Pop rock
- Length: 4:18
- Label: Reprise
- Songwriter: Jude Cole
- Producer: David Tyson

Jude Cole singles chronology
"Baby, It's Tonight" (1990)	"Time for Letting Go" (1990)	"House Full of Reasons" (1990)

"Time for Letting Go" is a song written by American guitarist and singer-songwriter Jude Cole. It appears on his second album, A View from 3rd Street (1990), and was released as the second single from the album. It peaked at No. 32 and 36 on the US Billboard Hot 100 and Cash Box Top 100 charts, and No. 16 on the Billboard Adult Contemporary chart.

== Reception ==
Billboard magazine called it a “smooth, adult-leaning pop-rock ballad” and praised Cole's “clean, emotional vocal delivery.” Cash Box said the track blended “melodic ease with a radio-friendly hook,” noting it as a potential crossover success.

== Music video ==
A music video was directed by Cole's longtime friend Kiefer Sutherland.

== Personnel ==
- Jude Cole – vocals, backing vocals, guitars
- David Tyson – keyboards, piano, organ, harmonium
- Tim Pierce – rhythm guitar
- Leland Sklar – bass
- Pat Mastelotto – drums, percussion

== Charts ==
Chart (1990)	Peak position
Australia (ARIA)	118
Canada Top Singles (RPM)	15
Canada Adult Contemporary (RPM)	16
US Billboard Hot 100	32
US Album Rock Tracks (Billboard)	33
US Adult Contemporary (Billboard)	16
US Cash Box Top 100	36

== Billy Ray Cyrus cover ==
"Time for Letting Go"

Single by Billy Ray Cyrus

from the album Shot Full of Love
- B-side: "Cover to Cover" (remix)
- Released: August 11, 1998
- Recorded: 1998
- Genre: Country rock
- Length: 4:14
- Label: Mercury
- Songwriter: Jude Cole
- Producers: John Kelton; Keith Stegall

Billy Ray Cyrus singles chronology
"It's All the Same to Me" (1997)	"Time for Letting Go" (1998)	"Busy Man" (1998)

American country music singer Billy Ray Cyrus recorded a cover of the song for his fifth studio album, Shot Full of Love (1998), and it was released as the lead single from that album. It peaked at No. 70 on the US Billboard Hot Country Singles chart.

=== Track listing ===
No.	Title	Writer(s)	Length
1.	"Time for Letting Go"		4:14
2.	"Cover to Cover" (remix)	Gary Burr	3:11

=== Charts ===
Chart (1998)	Peak position
US Hot Country Songs (Billboard)	70
