= No Name Face =

Studio album by Lifehouse
- Released: October 31, 2000
- Recorded: April–August 2000
- Genres: Alternative rock; post-grunge
- Length: 55:17
- Label: DreamWorks
- Producer: Ron Aniello

Lifehouse chronology
Diff's Lucky Day (1999)	No Name Face (2000)	Stanley Climbfall (2002)

Singles from No Name Face
- 1. "Hanging by a Moment" Released: September 25, 2000; 2. "Sick Cycle Carousel" Released: April 24, 2001; 3. "Breathing" Released: November 2, 2001

No Name Face is the debut studio album by American rock band Lifehouse. It was released on October 31, 2000, by DreamWorks Records and it produced the hit single "Hanging by a Moment" which went on to be the most played song on radio the following year. This album launched Lifehouse into the limelight, and has sold over four million copies worldwide, with 2,670,000 copies sold in the US alone.

Lead singer and songwriter Jason Wade originally formed Lifehouse as a church rock band, and often performed for church worship services before signing to the commercial record label DreamWorks.

== Reception ==
Professional ratings
Review scores
Source	Rating
AllMusic	3/5 stars
Cross Rhythms	9/10 stars
Jesus Freak Hideout	3.5/5 stars
Melodic.net	4/5 stars

Liana Jonas of AllMusic gave the album three out of five stars, noting how the "music aptly supports Wade's sonorous voice." She further commented on Wade's songwriting abilities by saying that Wade "is a lyrical wunderkind, writing words generally reserved for his older counterparts." iTunes compared Wade's voice on the album to Eddie Vedder of Pearl Jam, Scott Stapp of Creed, and Scott Weiland formerly of Stone Temple Pilots and Velvet Revolver. They then commented on the musicality of the album by saying, "it's an intelligent musical formula sorely missed in much music of the early 21st century". John DiBiase of Jesus Freak Hideout gave the album three-and-a-half out of five stars, and called the album a "good mainstream album to check out from a band who seems to have a lot to offer which we're bound to see in the near future". Dave Urbanski from Today's Christian Music applauded the instrumentation on the album and also said that the band had "skillful musicianship, poetic insight, [and] unflinching takes on faith".

== Promotion ==
On August 7, 2001, DreamWorks Records announced that Lifehouse was preparing for their first headlining tour in support of No Name Face. It was also announced that the opening acts would be The Calling and Michelle Branch. When asked how the band approaches live performances in an interview with MTV Radio, Wade said, "On the record, there's a couple tracks that are more mellow, with acoustic guitars and stuff. But in our live show, we've been trying to keep it really up-tempo. It's gotten a lot rockier than on the record. We try to step it up with the guitars, getting them crunchier and picking the tempos up to draw the crowd in more. So the live show's a little more energetic than the record."

== Track listing ==
All tracks are written by Jason Wade.

No Name Face track listing
No.	Title	Length
1.	"Hanging by a Moment"	3:36
2.	"Sick Cycle Carousel"	4:23
3.	"Unknown"	4:06
4.	"Somebody Else's Song"	4:36
5.	"Trying"	3:52
6.	"Only One"	4:56
7.	"Simon"	6:01
8.	"Cling and Clatter"	4:29
9.	"Breathing"	4:25
10.	"Quasimodo"	4:32
11.	"Somewhere in Between"	4:14
12.	"Everything"	6:07
Total length:		55:17

Special edition bonus tracks
No.	Title	Length
13.	"What's Wrong with That"	3:53
14.	"Fool"	4:20
Total length:		63:30

Japanese edition bonus track
No.	Title	Length
13.	"Fairytales and Castles"	3:51
Total length:		59:18

== Personnel ==
Produced by Ron Aniello

- Jason Wade – vocals, guitars
- Sergio Andrade – bass
- Jon Palmer – drums

=== Additional personnel ===
- Ron Aniello – guitar, bass, keyboards, percussion, engineer
- Collin Hayden – electric guitar
- Aaron Lord – viola; keyboards
- Marcus Barone – chamberlaine
- Aaron Embry – keyboards
- John Leftwich – string bass
- Bob Glaub – bass
- Jack Kelly – drums
- Matt Laug – drums
- Walter Rodriquez – tambourine
- Jude Cole – background vocals
- Kendall Payne – background vocals
- Neal Averon – engineer
- Jim Scott – engineer
- Brendan O'Brien – mixing
- Maxfield Parrish – cover painting

== Charts ==
=== Weekly charts ===
Weekly chart performance for No Name Face
Chart (2000–2002)	Peak position
Australian Albums (ARIA)	10
Canadian Albums (Billboard)	4
Danish Albums (Hitlisten)	2
Dutch Albums (Album Top 100)	61
Europe (European Top 100 Albums)	58
German Albums (Offizielle Top 100)	55
New Zealand Albums (RMNZ)	7
Scottish Albums (Official Charts)	84
UK Rock & Metal Albums (Official Charts)	13
US Billboard 200	6

=== Year-end charts ===
2001 year-end chart performance for No Name Face
Chart (2001)	Position
Australian Albums (ARIA)	55
Canadian Albums (Nielsen SoundScan)	34
Danish Albums (Hitlisten)	66
New Zealand Albums (RMNZ)	19
US Billboard 200	32

2002 year-end chart performance for No Name Face
Chart (2002)	Position
Canadian Alternative Albums (Nielsen SoundScan)	146

== Certifications ==
Certifications for No Name Face
Region	Certification	Certified units/sales
Australia (ARIA)	Platinum	70,000^{^}
Canada (Music Canada)	Platinum	100,000^{^}
Denmark (IFPI Danmark)	Gold	25,000^{^}
United States (RIAA)	2× Platinum	2,670,000
^{^} Shipments figures based on certification alone.
