= I Don't Know Why I Act This Way =

Studio album by Jude Cole
- Released: September 26, 1995
- Studio: Ocean Way Recording, Sunset Sound, The Sound Factory and Hollywood Sound Recorders (Hollywood, California)
- Genre: Rock
- Length: 41:34
- Label: Island
- Producer: Jude Cole; Ron Aniello; Kevin Killen

Jude Cole chronology
Start the Car (1992)	I Don't Know Why I Act This Way (1995)	Falling Home (2000)

Singles from I Don't Know Why I Act This Way
- 1. "Believe in You" Released: September 1995

Professional ratings
Review scores
Source	Rating
Allmusic	2/5 stars

I Don't Know Why I Act This Way is the fourth solo album by American singer-songwriter Jude Cole, released by Island Records on September 25, 1995.

A follow-up effort to Start the Car and A View from 3rd Street, I Don't Know Why I Act This Way discusses a variety of human emotions and conditions. Described as Cole's most "intense" lyrical effort, it is complete with complex arrangements and production. The album cover depicts Cole in the foreground, with the background a direct recreation of Edward Hopper's work. Specifically, the left side bears a powerful resemblance to Nighthawks, while the right is a direct copy of 7 AM.

== Track listing ==
All tracks are written by Jude Cole, except where noted.

No.	Title	Writer(s)	Length
1.	"Speed of Life"	Jude Cole; George Green	4:47
2.	"Believe in You"		4:01
3.	"Move If You're Goin'"		3:35
4.	"Lowlife"		4:56
5.	"Joe"	Cole; Green	4:36
6.	"Shiela Don't Remember"	Cole; Green	3:12
7.	"Take the Reins"		4:27
8.	"Madison"		3:54
9.	"Hole at the Top of the World"	Cole; Green	3:45
10.	"Heaven's Last Attempt"		4:21
Total length:			41:34

== Credits ==
=== Personnel ===
- Jude Cole – vocals, backing vocals, acoustic piano, guitars, bass (6)
- Jon Brion – Wurlitzer electric piano, Chamberlin, calliope, harmonium, guitars
- Mark Goldenberg – Hammond organ, guitars
- Phil Parlapiano – accordion
- Steve Porcaro – keyboards (5), acoustic piano (5)
- Ron Aniello – various sounds
- Lyle Workman – guitar solo (7)
- Paul Bushnell – bass (1–5, 7–10)
- Pat Mastelotto – drums, percussion
- Michael Lawrence – percussion (7)
- Chris Botti – trumpet
- Martin Tillman – cello
- Sally Dworsky – guest vocals (1)
- Kiefer Sutherland – guest vocals (5)
- Sam Llanas – guest vocals (6)

=== Production ===
- John S. Carter – A&R
- Ron Aniello – producer
- Jude Cole – producer
- Kevin Killen – producer, engineer, mixing
- John Paterno – additional engineer, assistant engineer
- Tom Nellen – assistant engineer
- Dave Shiffman – assistant engineer
- Bob Ludwig – mastering at Gateway Mastering (Portland, Maine)
- Duane Cole – guitar technician
- Matthew Schwartz – A&R coordinator
- Tony Wright – artwork
- Kristen Briggs – other photography
- Dorothy Low – booklet photography
- Siddons & Associates – management
