= Open Road (Jude Cole song) =

1992 song by Jude Cole

Song by Jude Cole

from the album Start the Car
- Released: August 25, 1992
- Genre: Americana
- Length: 5:19
- Label: Reprise
- Songwriter: Jude Cole
- Producers: Jude Cole; James Newton Howard

"Open Road" is a song by the American singer-songwriter Jude Cole. It appears as the third track on his album Start the Car, released in 1992 on Reprise Records. The song was produced by Cole and James Newton Howard.

== Background ==
"Open Road" was inspired by a road trip Cole took with actor Kiefer Sutherland to Savannah, Georgia, in 1987.

== Personnel ==
- Jude Cole – vocals, backing vocals, all guitars, bass guitar, mandocello
- James Newton Howard – keyboards, acoustic piano
- Marc Greene – Hammond organ
- Jeff Porcaro – drums

== Kiefer Sutherland cover ==
"Open Road"

Single by Kiefer Sutherland

from the album Reckless & Me
- Released: December 21, 2018
- Genre: Country; Americana
- Length: 4:42
- Label: BMG
- Songwriter: Jude Cole
- Producer: Jude Cole

Kiefer Sutherland singles chronology
"Can't Stay Away" (2016)	"Open Road" (2018)	"This Is How It's Done" (2019)

In 2018, Kiefer Sutherland recorded a cover of "Open Road", releasing it as a single on December 21 ahead of his album Reckless & Me (2019). Produced by Jude Cole, the version features Sutherland's raw vocals and was issued by BMG. Sutherland has described the song as one of his favorites, citing nostalgic reasons for covering it. Cole also plays acoustic guitar on the track.

=== Track listing ===
Digital single
No.	Title	Length
1.	"Open Road"	4:42

=== Personnel ===
- Kiefer Sutherland – vocals
- Jude Cole – acoustic guitar
- Waddy Wachtel – electric guitar
- Chris Chaney – bass guitar
- Brian MacLeod – drums
- Jim Cox – piano
- Chaz Mason – backing vocals
- Samantha Nelson – backing vocals
- Carmel Echols – backing vocals
- Greg Leisz – pedal steel
