= Billy Jack (album) =

Studio album by honeyhoney
- Released: October 25, 2011
- Genres: Americana, indie rock, country
- Length: 39:35
- Label: honeyhoney Records/Lost Highway
- Producers: Raymond Richards, Todd Averback, Matt Radosevich

Honeyhoney chronology
First Rodeo (2008)	Billy Jack (2011)	3 (2015)

Professional ratings
Review scores
Source	Rating
American Songwriter	3.5/5 stars

Billy Jack is honeyhoney's second studio album, released on Oct 24, 2011 under their own honeyhoney Records/Lost Highway label.

== Track list ==
All tracks are written by Ben Jaffe and Suzanne Santo, except where noted

No.	Title	Writer(s)	Length
1.	"Angel of Death"		4:01
2.	"Glad I've Done What I Did"		4:06
3.	"Ohio"		3:52
4.	"Don't Know How"	Santo and Josh Rouse	4:01
5.	"Turn That Finger Around"		3:49
6.	"I Don't Mind"		2:14
7.	"Old School Friends"		2:55
8.	"Let's Get Wrecked"		3:08
9.	"L.A. River"		2:44
10.	"All on You"		3:59
11.	"Thin Line"		4:46

== Charts ==
Chart	Peak position
Top Heatseekers	17
Billboard Folk Album	15
