= Loose Boots (EP) =

EP by honeyhoney
- Released: February 26, 2008
- Genre: Americana, indie rock, alternative country
- Length: 14:21
- Label: Ironworks
- Producer: Jude Cole, honeyhoney

Honeyhoney chronology
Loose Boots (2008)	First Rodeo (2008)

Professional ratings
Review scores
Source	Rating
PopMatters	7/10 stars
Robert Christgau	A-

Loose Boots is honeyhoney's first release and their only EP, released on February 26, 2008, on Ironworks. Keifer Sutherland, founder of Ironworks, starred in the video of "Little Toy Gun", playing a disheveled gambler who runs into the wrong woman, played by lead singer Suzanne Santo.

== Track listing ==
All tracks are written by Ben Jaffe and Suzanne Santo

No.	Title	Length
1.	"Little Toy Gun"	2:43
2.	"Give Yourself to Me"	2:36
3.	"Bouncing Ball"	3:51
4.	"Thursday Night"	2:30
5.	"David"	2:41
