= Hanging by a Moment =

2000 single by Lifehouse

Single by Lifehouse

from the album No Name Face
- B-side: "Fairytales Sandcastles"; "What's Wrong with That"; "Fool"
- Released: September 25, 2000
- Genre: Alternative rock; post-grunge
- Length: 3:36
- Label: DreamWorks
- Songwriter: Jason Wade
- Producer: Ron Aniello

Lifehouse singles chronology
"Hanging by a Moment" (2000)	"Sick Cycle Carousel" (2001)

"Hanging by a Moment" is a song by American alternative rock band Lifehouse. It was the first single released from their debut studio album, No Name Face (2000), issued through DreamWorks Records. The track was written by lead singer Jason Wade, who said that he wrote the song in about five minutes without thinking about what would happen to it. It was produced by American record producer Ron Aniello and was mixed by Brendan O'Brien. Musically, "Hanging by a Moment" is a post-grunge song that contains influences of alternative rock.

The song was first released as a radio single on September 25, 2000, rising slowly on the US charts and eventually peaking at number two on the Billboard Hot 100, becoming the band's most successful single on the chart and the most successful song of 2001 in the US. The track became an international success as well, peaking atop the Australian Singles Chart for five weeks and reaching the top 40 in the Netherlands, New Zealand, and the United Kingdom. In 2001, the song was certified double platinum by the Australian Recording Industry Association (ARIA) and was the most-played radio track of that year in Canada. The song received positive reviews from critics, who applauded its instrumentation.

The official music video for the song premiered on VH1.com on December 7, 2000. In the video, Wade is seen singing the lyrics of the song in many locations around a town. The band went on tours with Matchbox Twenty and 3 Doors Down as an opening act before going on their first headline tour that featured rock band the Calling and singer Michelle Branch.

== Background and composition ==
"Hanging by a Moment"
A sample of "Hanging by a Moment" featuring the main chorus of "I'm hanging by a moment here with you..."

"I was eight songs into finishing the record, doing a vocal, and I heard the melody in my head before it was written. I couldn't tell if it was a song on the radio that I had heard or if it was a song my friend wrote or something. I picked up a guitar and it was kind of creepy, because the song was almost already written by itself. Within five minutes, the lyrics and everything else were finished. We tracked it the next week and it ended up being the first single. It was funny, because I felt there was another song that needed to be written during the project that was more upbeat and less moody."

— Wade talking about the development of "Hanging by a Moment".

The song "Hanging by a Moment" was written by Lifehouse lead singer Jason Wade. It was produced by American record producer Ron Aniello and was mixed by Brendan O'Brien. When asked about the song in an interview with Billboard, Wade said, "It was the most uptempo, radio-friendly song. We all decided it was the right choice to release it as the first single." He went on to describe his expectations when writing songs, saying, "My ultimate goal in writing songs is to connect with people. In the lyrics, you don't tell the whole picture: You give a road to start on that people can relate to. We're honest, nice guys and I hope that comes across in everything we do." After being asked how he wrote the song in an interview with Launch, Wade explained, "I wrote that song without thinking about what was gonna happen to it and then it just kinda took over from there." He also said in the interview that he wrote "Hanging by a Moment" in about five minutes.

"Hanging by a Moment" was described as a post-grunge and alternative rock song that contains a strong melody. According to the sheet music published at Musicnotes.com by Sony/ATV Music Publishing, the song is set in common time with a "moderate rock" tempo of 124 beats per minute. It is composed in the key of D-flat major. In an interview with Billboard, lead singer and guitarist of Lifehouse, Jason Wade, described the song as an "uptempo, radio-friendly song". Bill Lamb of About.com called the song "one of the biggest rock hits ever by a Contemporary Christian band crossing over into the mainstream. The song was the biggest hit of summer 2001 and was eventually named the most played song of the year on the radio." Sean Rizzo of Sputnikmusic says that the song "presents one of the best with the guitar's plucking during the verses and a chorus infectious enough to infiltrate your brain for a few days." In a 2017 interview with Billboard on the core theme of the song, Wade said, "I didn't really think about it when I was writing it. I knew at the end of it that it was a love song, and I kind of come from that world, so it can be interpreted as a spiritual song or a love song."

== Chart performance ==
"Hanging by a Moment" debuted at number 76 on the Billboard Hot 100 during the week of February 10, 2001. It gradually ascended on the chart and eventually peaked at number two on June 16, 2001. It remained on the Hot 100 for 54 consecutive weeks. The song was also a hit on rock radio, holding number one for three weeks beginning on January 27, 2001. On the Billboard Modern Rock Tracks chart, the song debuted at number 36 for the week of October 28, 2000, and eventually peaked at number one, remaining on the chart for 35 weeks. The song debuted at number 32 on the Billboard Mainstream Top 40 chart during the week of March 3, 2001. After moving around the chart for 37 consecutive weeks, the song peaked at number two on May 19, 2001. The song debuted at number 37 on the Billboard Adult Top 40 chart for the week of February 24, 2001. It eventually peaked at number one on June 23, 2001, spending 74 consecutive weeks on the chart. Despite not peaking at number one on the weekly Hot 100, "Hanging by a Moment" was the most successful single of 2001 according to Billboard. In 2009, Billboard named "Hanging by a Moment" as the 26th-most-successful single of the 2000s decade.

The song also achieved international success. In Australia, the song debuted at number 36 on the ARIA Singles Chart during the week of June 17, 2001. On August 12, 2001, it peaked at number one, staying on the chart for 24 consecutive weeks. Because of its success in Australia, "Hanging by a Moment" was certified double platinum by the ARIA in 2001. The track debuted on the Netherlands' Single Top 100 chart at number 95 for the week of June 9, 2001, and reached number 31 the following month. On the New Zealand Singles Chart, "Hanging by a Moment" debuted at number 48 for the week of March 11, 2001. After climbing for 16 consecutive weeks, it peaked at number six for five weeks. The song debuted at number 25 on the UK Singles Chart for the week of September 8, 2001, which became its peak position, and it spent four weeks on the chart.

== Music video ==
Former Lifehouse bassist Sergio Andrade (left) and Lifehouse lead singer Jason Wade (right) perform in front of a crowd in a restaurant in the music video.

The music video, directed by Gavin Bowden, was first released on December 7, 2000, on VH1.com. It served as an official video for the song, after an unofficial version was released by DreamWorks as a "temporary video" that was played on MTV2. In an interview with MTV Radio, Wade explained the process of making the music video, and said, "We shot the video at this really cool place in Crenshaw, in L.A., that was a bowling alley upstairs and a roller rink downstairs. It had this really weird, retro vibe to it. When they were setting up the different sets, we'd have to stop every 10 seconds because a bowling league would walk in. It was the coolest thing. At night, we got all of our friends to come down."

The video begins with Wade singing and playing his guitar in a hotel room. While singing, Wade is seen packing his clothes into a suit case in separate camera shots. He then leaves the hotel room and it shows a time-lapse scene of a car going down a highway. Then, the video cuts to a restaurant, where Wade is seen lying on a restaurant booth and singing the lyrics of the song. After this, Wade is seen with the rest of Lifehouse in a concert setting in a restaurant. It then splits to shots of Wade singing the lyrics of the song to the camera. Toward the end of the video, it switches to Lifehouse playing the song in front of a crowd while showing shots of Wade in a car going down a highway. It ends with the scene of Lifehouse in a restaurant and then switches to a camera shot of all of the band members with the video fading out on Wade.

== Promotion ==
On January 10, 2001, MTV confirmed that Lifehouse would serve as an opening act on a fourteen-day tour for Matchbox Twenty, who were promoting their album Mad Season (2000). The tour started February 27, 2001, in Minneapolis and ended on March 29, 2001, in Universal City. While on tour with Matchbox Twenty, Lifehouse went on The Tonight Show with Jay Leno for the first time and performed "Hanging by a Moment" on March 28, 2001. Several months later, the band performed the song at the River Rave Festival in Foxboro Stadium on May 26, 2001. In July 2001, Lifehouse went on tour, opening for 3 Doors Down on twelve select dates, and performed songs from No Name Face, including "Hanging by a Moment".

== Formats and track listings ==
- Australian and Japanese CD single
1. "Hanging by a Moment" – 3:36
2. "Fairytales Sandcastles" – 3:52
3. "What's Wrong with That" – 3:54
4. "Fool" – 4:21
- UK CD single
1. "Hanging by a Moment" – 3:36
2. "Fairy Tales" – 3:52
3. "Hanging by a Moment" (acoustic version) – 3:30
4. CD-ROM — "Hanging by a Moment" music video

== Credits and personnel ==
Credits are adapted from AllMusic.

- Songwriting – Jason Wade
- Production – Ron Aniello
- Mixing – Brendan O'Brien
- Engineering – Bob Kearny, Marc Green, Paul Hayden

== Charts ==
=== Weekly charts ===
Weekly chart performance for "Hanging by a Moment"
Chart (2001)	Peak position
Australia (ARIA)	1
Canada CHR (Nielsen BDS)	2
Denmark Airplay (Tracklisten)	20
Europe (Eurochart Hot 100)	73
Germany (GfK)	62
Ireland (IRMA)	42
Netherlands (Dutch Top 40)	19
Netherlands (Single Top 100)	31
New Zealand (Recorded Music NZ)	6
Quebec Airplay (ADISQ)	5
Scottish Singles Sales (Official Charts)	16
UK Singles (Official Charts)	25
UK Rock & Metal (Official Charts)	2
US Billboard Hot 100	2
US Adult Alternative Airplay (Billboard)	5
US Adult Pop Airplay (Billboard)	1
US Alternative Airplay (Billboard)	1
US Mainstream Rock (Billboard)	7
US Pop Airplay (Billboard)	2

=== Year-end charts ===
2001 year-end chart performance for "Hanging by a Moment"
Chart (2001)	Position
Australia (ARIA)	5
Brazil (Crowley)	73
Canada Radio (Nielsen BDS)	1
Netherlands (Dutch Top 40)	49
New Zealand (RIANZ)	4
US Billboard Hot 100	1
US Adult Top 40 (Billboard)	3
US Mainstream Rock (Billboard)	17
US Mainstream Top 40 (Billboard)	1
US Modern Rock Tracks (Billboard)	3
US Triple-A (Billboard)	10

2002 year-end chart performance for "Hanging by a Moment"
Chart (2002)	Position
Canada Radio (Nielsen BDS)	44
European Rock Radio (Music & Media)	16
US Adult Top 40 (Billboard)	12

=== Decade-end charts ===
Decade-end chart performance for "Hanging by a Moment"
Chart (2000–2009)	Position
Australia (ARIA)	80
US Billboard Hot 100	26
US Mainstream Top 40 (Billboard)	2

=== All-time charts ===
All-time chart performance for "Hanging by a Moment"
Chart (1958–2018)	Position
US Billboard Hot 100	164

== Certifications ==
Certifications and sales for "Hanging by a Moment"
Region	Certification	Certified units/sales
Australia (ARIA)	2× Platinum	140,000^{^}
New Zealand (RMNZ)	Platinum	30,000^{‡}
^{^} Shipments figures based on certification alone.^{‡} Sales+streaming figures based on certification alone.

== Release history ==
Release dates and formats for "Hanging by a Moment"
Region	Date	Format(s)	Label(s)	Ref.
United States	September 25, 2000	Mainstream rock; alternative radio	DreamWorks	
United States	January 30, 2001	Contemporary hit radio	DreamWorks	
Australia	April 16, 2001	CD single	DreamWorks	
United States	April 24, 2001	CD single	DreamWorks	
Japan	July 18, 2001	CD single	DreamWorks	
United Kingdom	August 27, 2001	CD single; cassette single	DreamWorks	

== See also ==
- List of number-one singles of 2001 (Australia)

== Works cited ==
- Juzwiak, Richard (2006). Lifehouse. New York: The Rosen Publishing Group. ISBN 1-4042-0710-4.
