= Huw Gower =

- Instruments: Guitar, vocals
- Years active: 1970s – present
- Formerly of: The Records

Huw Gower is a British guitarist. He was the lead guitarist of The Records from 1978 to 1980, appearing on their debut album Shades in Bed and hit single "Starry Eyes". After leaving The Records, Gower moved to New York City and played guitar for Carlene Carter, Rachel Sweet, David Johansen, and Graham Parker among others, while recording a solo EP entitled "Guitarophilia".
