= Falling Home (Jude Cole album) =

Studio album by Jude Cole
- Released: September 1, 2000
- Genre: Rock
- Length: 47:38
- Label: Watertown
- Producer: Jude Cole

Jude Cole chronology
I Don't Know Why I Act This Way (1995)	Falling Home (2000)	In Plain Sight (2017)

Professional ratings
Review scores
Source	Rating
AllMusic	2/5 stars

Falling Home is the fifth solo album by American singer-songwriter Jude Cole, released by his Watertown Records label on September 1, 2000. The album was not released by a major record label, and was Cole's first independent release.

== Track listing ==
1. "My Friend Stan" (0:51)
2. "I Won't Bleed" (3:49)
3. "Braking Wheels" (4:15)
4. "Leave Me Alone" (5:11)
5. "Falling Home" (4:52)
6. "Any Dark Day" (4:49)
7. "More Than A Breakup Song" (3:21)
8. "Somewhere" (3:39)
9. "Raining On The Moon" (3:54)
10. "You Make It Easy" (4:49)
11. "Inhale" (3:23)
12. "Peaceful In Mine" (3:45)
