= Paul Conroy (music executive) =

Paul Martin Conroy
- Born: 14 June 1949 (age 76); Surbiton, Surrey, England
- Education: Newman University
- Occupation: Music Consultant
- Spouse(s): Maxine Conroy, Katie Conroy
- Children: Drew William, Molly Paris
- Parent(s): Dennis Charles Conroy, Muriel Conroy

Paul Conroy (born 14 June 1949) is an English music executive and record label manager. He went from general manager of the indie label Stiff Records to senior positions with Virgin Records, WEA, and EMI.

== Early life and education ==
Paul Conroy was born in Surbiton Hospital in Surbiton and Esher, Surrey, England. His father, Dennis Charles Conroy, was a police officer. His mother was Muriel Conroy (late Eckett, formerly Hutcheson). He grew up in Tolworth.

He studied at Newman University in the 1960s to become a teacher. His introduction to the music business came as a college social secretary in the early 1970s.

== Career ==
Conroy's first job was working as a booking agent for the Charisma Agency, where he worked with Nigel Kerr booking pub rock bands. In 1975, they collaborated with Jake Riviera to put on the Naughty Rhythms package tour, with pub rock band Kokomo, Dr. Feelgood, and Chilli Willi and the Red Hot Peppers. Conroy became the manager of The Kursaal Flyers, who got signed to Jonathan King's UK Records and had a hit with the song "Little Does She Know". Conroy had the band perform on Top of the Pops surrounded by laundry machines and giant detergent boxes.

In early 1977, Conroy went to work for Stiff Records, where he became the general manager working with Elvis Costello, Nick Lowe, Ian Dury, and Madness. Between 1985 and 1990, he was first Marketing Director and then Managing Director of the US labels division of WEA in London.

He then went on to become president of Chrysalis Records International from 1990 to 1992. Conroy joined Virgin Records UK as Managing Director in 1992 and was promoted to President in 1997 before leaving in early 2002. Acts signed to Virgin at the time included the Spice Girls, Meatloaf, Massive Attack, The Verve, and George Michael.

Later in 2002, Conroy and his wife Katie, a former EMI International VP, launched Adventures in Music, which comprised three divisions - Adventure Records, Management, and Publishing, culminating in the Christmas number one in the UK in 2003 with a cover version of the Tears for Fears song "Mad World" performed by Michael Andrew and Gary Jules. They were also the first label to win an Ivor Novello Award for that single.

Conroy served as chairman of the BRIT Awards committee starting in 1997. He was a member of the BPI Council, before stepping down in 2002.

In 2011, he encouraged the Wallingford Parish Church Choir to enter a national competition, in which they won to record an album for Decca Records.

Since 2002 he has been working as founder and CEO of Adventures in Music.
