= The Kursaal Flyers =

English band

- Origin: Southend-on-Sea, England
- Genre: Pub rock
- Years active: 1973–1977
- Labels: UK, CBS
- Spinoffs: The Records
- Past members: Paul Shuttleworth; Richie Bull; Graeme Douglas; Will Birch; Vic Collins; Dave Hatfield; Barry Martin

The Kursaal Flyers were a British pub rock band, formed in Southend-on-Sea in 1973. They are most famous for their 1976 single "Little Does She Know" (which was a top 20 hit) and were the subject of a BBC documentary following them on tour in 1975.

== Original members ==
- Paul Shuttleworth (born 24 December 1947, London) - vocals
- Richie Bull (born Richard Bull, 23 October 1948, Corringham, Essex) - banjo, bass guitar
- Graeme Douglas (born Graeme John Douglas, 22 January 1950, Rochford, Essex) - lead guitar, later replaced by Barry Martin
- Will Birch (born Martin J Birch, 12 September 1948, in Stratford, London) - drums
- Vic Collins (born Victor Collins, 10 September 1950, Rochford, Essex) - pedal steel guitar
- Dave Hatfield - bass guitar (left in 1974)

== Career ==
The group formed when Shuttleworth, Douglas, Birch, Collins, Bull and Hatfield, who had all performed locally in various combinations around Southend, got together in October 1973 to form a new band. They made their first appearance together as the Kursaal Flyers – named after the imitation train which was used to advertise Southend's famous amusement hall, the Kursaal, which had recently closed – at the Blue Boar pub in Victoria Avenue, Southend-on-Sea, in February 1974, mainly playing covers of country rock songs but over time increasingly writing their own material.

Through contacts in the band with Dr. Feelgood, they played some support slots in London, where they were seen by influential agents and songwriters. All bar Hatfield turned professional at the start of 1975, signed for Jonathan King's UK Records, and released their first album Chocs Away. Although the singles "Speedway" and "Hit Records" received some airplay, the band failed to garner any commercial success. Their second album, The Great Artiste, also sold poorly.

Nevertheless the band developed a solid live reputation on the London pub rock scene, with an eclectic mixture of original material and cover versions, fronted by Paul Shuttleworth's "wide boy" persona.

In 1976, they signed with the CBS label, and recorded their third album, The Golden Mile, with record producer Mike Batt. One of their songs, "Little Does She Know", was singled out by Batt for an over-the-top Phil Spector style production. Paul Conroy, the band's then manager, arranged for the group to perform the song on BBC Television's Top of the Pops in November 1976, surrounded by giant detergent boxes and laundry machines. The single became their only hit record, reaching number 14 on the UK Singles Chart. However, Graeme Douglas was concerned about the over-commercialisation of the group's music and left to join Eddie and the Hot Rods, being replaced by Barry Martin.

The group toured widely and issued another album, Five Live Kursaals, but failed to gain any further commercial success and, after numerous personnel changes, the band disintegrated in late 1977.

Following the Kursaals' demise, Shuttleworth released several solo records, Douglas enjoyed success with Eddie and the Hot Rods, and Birch formed the Records. The group reformed for tours in 1985 and 1988, and in 2001 they reformed on a more permanent basis. In 2009, Collins became manager of Back To Square One, an adolescent four-piece rock band from Shoeburyness and Great Wakering in Southend. In 2003, Shuttleworth and Collins formed the Country Rock band the Ugly Guys, with former Jerry the Ferret guitarist Steve Oliver, Andy Farrell, bass, ex of the Hamsters and Bob Clouter on drums.

== Discography ==
=== Studio albums ===
- Chocs Away! (1975, UK Records)
- The Great Artiste (1976, UK Records)
- Golden Mile (1976, CBS)
- A Former Tour de Force is Forced to Tour (1988, Waterfront Records)

=== Live albums ===
- Five Live Kursaals (1977, CBS)

=== Singles ===
Year	Single	Chart positions
Year	Single	UK
1975	"Speedway"	-
1975	"Hit Records"	-
1976	"Cruisin' for Love"	-
1976	"Little Does She Know"	14
1977	"Radio Romance"	-
1977	"The Sky's Falling in on Our Love"	-
1977	"T.V. Dinners" (Promo)	-
1977	"Television Generation"	-
1983	"Radio Romance" (Germany-only re-release)	-
1985	"Monster-in-Law"	-

== See also ==
- Canvey Island
- List of performers on Top of the Pops
- List of Peel sessions
- Fairport's Cropredy Convention Appearances
