= Baby, It's Tonight =

Single by Jude Cole

from the album A View from 3rd Street
- B-side: "Heart of Blues"
- Released: March 1990
- Recorded: 1989
- Genre: Pop rock
- Length: 3:40
- Label: Reprise
- Songwriter: Jude Cole
- Producer: David Tyson

Jude Cole singles chronology
"You Were in My Heart" (1987)	"Baby, It's Tonight" (1990)	"Time for Letting Go" (1990)

"Baby, It's Tonight" is a song by American singer-songwriter and guitarist Jude Cole. Written by Cole and produced by David Tyson, the song was released by Reprise Records in March 1990 as the lead single from his second album, A View from 3rd Street (1990).

"Baby It's Tonight" remains Cole's highest-charting single, peaking at numbers 11 and 16 on the US Cash Box Top 100 and Billboard Hot 100 charts. It also peaked at number three on the Billboard Album Rock Tracks chart in the US and number six on the RPM Top Singles Chart. On year-end charts, the song ranked 11th on the Top Album Rock Tracks chart and 37th on the RPM Top Singles chart.

== Reception ==
Billboard magazine called "Baby, It's Tonight" an exceptional, memorable, and catchy pop/rocker in the vein of John Waite and Bruce Springsteen.

== Track listing ==
7-inch single

1. "Baby, It's Tonight" – 3:40
2. "Heart of Blues" – 4:59

12-inch single

1. "Baby, it's Tonight" – 3:40
2. "Heart of Blues" – 4:59
3. "Like Lovers Do" – 4:42

== Personnel ==
- Jude Cole – vocals, backing vocals, guitars, bass
- David Tyson – keyboards, piano, organ, harmonium
- Tim Pierce – rhythm guitar
- Pat Mastelotto – drums, percussion

== Charts ==
=== Weekly charts ===
Chart (1990)	Peak position
Australia (ARIA)	106
Canada Top Singles (RPM)	6
US Billboard Hot 100	16
US Album Rock Tracks (Billboard)	3
US Adult Contemporary (Billboard)	19
US Cash Box Top 100	11

=== Year-end charts ===
Chart (1990)	Peak position
Canada Top Singles (RPM)	37
US Top Album Rock Tracks (Billboard)	11
