= Believe in You =

1995 single by Jude Cole

Single by Jude Cole

from the album I Don't Know Why I Act This Way
- B-side: "Speed of Life"
- Released: September 1995
- Genre: Acoustic pop
- Length: 4:01
- Label: Island
- Songwriter: Jude Cole
- Producers: Jude Cole; Ron Aniello; Kevin Killen

Jude Cole singles chronology
"Worlds Apart" (1993)	"Believe in You" (1995)

"Believe in You" is a song performed by American singer-songwriter Jude Cole. It was released as the only single from his fourth album I Don't Know Why I Act This Way. "Believe in You" is Cole's first and only single released on Island Records, and the first song to be produced by co-producer Ron Aniello. It peaked at No. 37 on the Adult Contemporary chart.

== Reception ==
Billboard praised Jude Cole's single "Believe in You," stating that it "boggles the mind that Cole is not properly acknowledged in the industry as a tunesmith with an uncanny knack for crafting perfect pop songs." The review highlighted the first single from his Island debut, I Don't Know Why I Act This Way, describing it as "a concise, deliciously melodic song that sticks to the brain upon impact." Billboard noted that the track's "quietly acoustic rock production" made it suitable for programming alongside acts such as Hootie & the Blowfish, and that Cole "sounds as earnest and engaging as ever."

== Personnel ==
- Jude Cole – vocals, guitars, piano
- Jon Brion – Wurlitzer electric piano, chamberlin, harmonium
- Paul Bushnell – bass guitar
- Pat Mastelotto – drums, percussion
- Mark Goldenberg – organ

== Charts ==
Chart (1995–1996)	Peak position
Canada Top Singles (RPM)	76
Canada Adult Contemporary (RPM)	55
US Adult Contemporary (Billboard)	37
