= I Still Believe in You =

I Still Believe in You may refer to:

- I Still Believe in You (album), by Vince Gill, 1992
  - "I Still Believe in You" (Vince Gill song), its title track
- "I Still Believe in You" (Cliff Richard song), 1992
- "I Still Believe in You" (The Desert Rose Band song), 1988
