= Honeyhoney =

American musical group

honeyhoney
- Origin: Los Angeles, California, United States
- Genres: Americana, alternative country, indie rock
- Years active: 2006–2017
- Labels: Ironworks honeyhoney Records/Lost Highway; Rounder
- Members: Benjamin Jaffe - Guitar, Vocals; Suzanne Santo - Vocals, Banjo, Violin

Honeyhoney (stylized as honeyhoney) was an Americana group based in Los Angeles, California, United States.

== History ==
The band was formed in 2006 by musician Benjamin Jaffe and musician/model/actress Suzanne Santo. The two met at a costume party and signed a record deal a year later. They originally performed under the name Zanzibar Lewis and were under that name when they signed with the now-defunct Ironworks record label.

Their debut album, First Rodeo, was released by Ironworks on November 4. Ironworks co-owner Kiefer Sutherland directed and starred in the group's music video for their song "Little Toy Gun". Honeyhoney toured with Lifehouse, another Ironworks band, at the start of their career. The band released their second studio album, Billy Jack, on Oct 24, 2011 under their own honeyhoney Records/Lost Highway label.

Their third album, 3, was produced by Dave Cobb and released June 9, 2015. The website American Songwriter reviewed it writing, "with a singer-songwriter that exudes the magnetic passion and swaggering star power of Santo, this is a group whose time has come."

The duo parted with Rounder and disbanded in 2017.

== Style ==
Paste Magazine describes honeyhoney's style as "display[ing] the common pop thread between alt.country, spaghetti western soundtracks and swampy blues."

Glide Magazine stated that "honeyhoney deftly mixes elements of folk, soul, country, pop, and rock."

== Outreach ==
In April 2014, the band traveled to Williamstown, Massachusetts, where Jaffe was raised, to perform a concert on behalf of local music programs. The band is planning a similar concert for schools in Santo's hometown of Cleveland, Ohio.

== Discography ==
=== Albums ===
Year	Album details	Peak chart positions	
Year	Album details	Top Heatseekers	Billboard Folk Album
2008	First Rodeo: Released: November 4, 2008; Label: Ironworks	—	—
2011	Billy Jack: Released: October 25, 2011; Label: honeyhoney Records/Lost Highway	17	15
2015	3: Released: June 9, 2015; Label: Rounder	7	10
"—" denotes a release that did not chart or was not issued in that region.

=== Extended plays ===
Year	Details
2008	Loose Boots: Released: February 26, 2008; Label: Ironworks

== Suzanne Santo collaborations ==
- "On the Shelf" from the album Fool's Gold by Big B
- "The Game" by Oleg Tumanov
- "Take Me Away" from the album Starting Ground by Josh Blackburn

== In the media ==
- Their song "Lullaby" was featured in an anti-smoking ad that featured the grim reaper disguised as an attractive woman who gave out free cigarettes
- Their song "Little Toy Gun" was featured in a promo for the Showtime network
- Their song "LA River" was used in the series finale of the series Brothers & Sisters
- The band performed the opening theme for the first season of the television series The Guest Book, appear at the end of every episode to perform a song live at a "venue" in the series, and make a few brief appearances in other scenes.
