= John Wicks (singer) =

English singer-songwriter and producer (1953–2018)

- Born: 28 February 1953; Caversham, Reading, Berkshire, England
- Died: 7 October 2018 (aged 65) Burbank, California
- Genres: New wave; power pop
- Occupations: Singer; songwriter; record producer
- Instruments: Vocals; guitar
- Years active: 1978-2018
- Formerly of: The Records

John Richard Wicks (28 February 1953 – 7 October 2018) was an English singer-songwriter and record producer, who worked with numerous artists in the United States and the United Kingdom. Wicks was best known as the lead singer-songwriter for the UK rock and power pop band The Records, formed in London by former members of The Kursaal Flyers, during the 1977 punk rock movement. After The Records went their separate ways in 1982, Wicks remained musically active, writing, recording and performing new material, including with several musicians such as Debbi Peterson.

The songs of Wicks and his lyricist partner, Will Birch, have been recorded by The Searchers, Mary Chapin Carpenter, Too Much Joy, Michael Monroe, and numerous other artists.

== Career ==
Wicks was born in Caversham, Reading, Berkshire, England.

As a British power pop band, The Records recorded three albums for Virgin Records: Shades In Bed (1979), Crashes (1980), and Music On Both Sides (1982). Unlike many bands, The Records lasted through the punk era and into the new wave music scene, before going their separate ways in 1982. Wicks became a producer and songwriter in addition to his work as a solo artist.

Wicks recorded a series of professional demos in the early 1980s, including "The Way That Love Goes", "Prisoner of Love" and "Nowhere Left To Run". "The Way That Love Goes" was later covered by Dominique. Produced by Ahmet Ertegun, it was the B-side of her 1984 single on Atlantic Records, "Changes of Heart".

In 1990, The Records temporarily reunited to record a version of "Darlin'" for a Brian Wilson tribute CD, that was being put together for DeMilo Records in New York; the same year that the US release of Paying for the Summer of Love, a compilation of 1978 demos by the group was released.

In 1994, Wicks emigrated from the UK to the US and formed a new incarnation of the band, under the moniker 'John Wicks and The Records', booking shows primarily in the US and Europe. By the middle of 1995, John Wicks and The Records recorded Solace In Wonderland, a limited edition promo cassette of country-rock/folk tinged songs. An album, Rock 'ola, was released by the Spanish label Rock Indiana in March 1998, to coincide with a John Wicks and The Records tour of Spain.

In 2001, Angel Air Records released a repackaged CD of Paying for the Summer of Love with all-new artwork and liner notes by Wicks. In 2002, Wicks' lyricist partner, Will Birch, licensed the back catalogue from UK Virgin to his On The Beach label, releasing a deluxe CD edition of Shades In Bed, which featured ten bonus tracks, including every cut from the High Heels EP. This was followed by the 2005 release of the deluxe CD edition of Crashes, which included six bonus tracks. Then in 2007, he released the deluxe CD edition of Music On Both Sides, which also included six bonus tracks.

In April 2007, Wicks released a new twelve-track CD entitled Rotate as John Wicks and the Records, on the Kool Kat Musik label. Although described as an anthology Rotate contained several new tracks along with three remastered versions, and one new version of previously issued songs. Five bonus tracks were also featured on a special, signed, limited edition two disc version. Also included on the CD, is a cover version of The Beatles song "We Can Work It Out", with band member Randy Hoffman on lead vocals, and Wicks on all background vocals. An alternate version of this track can be found on the Bullseye Records CD It Was 40 Years Ago Today.

In 2008, Wicks took a new Records' line up to Japan to play three live shows in support of Japanese label, Air Mail Recordings, release of a 17 track CD The Records Play Live In Evanston 1980. This recording featured The Records with Wicks on rhythm guitar, Birch on drums, Phil Brown on bass and Jude Cole on lead guitar. The same year, a ten-track 'budget' version of Rotate was released on the Collectables label.

In 2009, Wicks embarked on a nationwide acoustic tour with Paul Collins.

In 2011, Kool Kat released Lessons Learned (Live & Unplugged) a nine track DVD, recorded live at McCabe's in Santa Monica, California, on 28 August 2010. In November that year, under the moniker of 'The Records – featuring John Wicks', The Fuel Label Group released a repackaged and remastered CD of Rotate; this time with a 14 track listing, which includes the brand new version of "Starry Eyes". In 2012, Kool Kat released a twelve-track Wicks compilation CD, entitled Works in Progress.

In addition to working on his new album, Wicks planned to record an acoustic album to complement his solo acoustic performances. Tentatively entitled – "Chasing Angels" – inspired by its namesake song, which he wrote and dedicated to the memory of former bandmate, bassist, Phil Brown, who died on 2 February 2012.

Most recently Wicks worked with Debbi Peterson of The Bangles, in addition to concerts showcasing his material, both solo and with a new incarnation of The Records. The latter featured a five-piece line-up, billed as John Wicks and The Records.

Wicks died from pancreatic cancer in Burbank, California, United States, on 7 October 2018, at the age of 65.

== Discography ==
- The Records: Shades In Bed LP (Virgin 1979)
- The Records: "High Heels" EP (Virgin 1979)
- The Records: Crashes LP (Virgin 1980)
- The Records: Music On Both Sides LP (Virgin 1982)
- The Records: A Sunny Afternoon In Waterloo 8 Track CD (Line 1988)
- The Records: Smashes Crashes And Near Misses 20 Track Compilation CD (Caroline 1988)
- The Records: Paying For the Summer Of Love 14 Track Compilation CD (Skyclad 1990)
- John Wicks: "Solace In Wonderland" (6 Track Promo Cassette 1994)
- John Wicks and The Records: Rock 'ola 10 Track CD (Rock Indiana 1998)
- The Records: Paying For the Summer Of Love 14 Track Compilation CD (Angel Air 2001)
- The Records: Shades In Bed reissue CD + bonus tracks (On The Beach 2002)
- The Records: Crashes reissue CD + bonus tracks (On The Beach 2005)
- The Records: Music On Both Sides reissue CD + bonus tracks (On The Beach 2007)
- John Wicks and The Records: Rotate 12 Track CD (Kool Kat 2007)
- The Records: The Records Play Live In Evanston 1980 17 Track CD (Air Mail 2008)
- John Wicks and The Records: Rotate 10 Track CD (Collectables 2009)
- The Records – featuring John Wicks: Rotate 14 Track CD – included new version of "Starry Eyes" (Remastered & Repackaged, by The Fuel Label Group 2011)
- John Wicks: Lessons Learned (Live & Unplugged) 9 Track DVD (Kool Kat 2011)
- John Wicks: Works In Progress 12 Track Compilation CD-R (Kool Kat 2012)
