= A View from 3rd Street =

Studio album by Jude Cole
- Released: March 27, 1990
- Recorded: 1989–1990
- Studios: Westlake Audio (Los Angeles); The Village Recorder (Los Angeles); Phase II Recording (Los Angeles); Take One (Burbank); Ocean Way (Hollywood); Clearlake Audio (North Hollywood)
- Genre: Pop rock
- Length: 43:59
- Label: Reprise
- Producer: David Tyson

Jude Cole chronology
Jude Cole (1987)	A View from 3rd Street (1990)	Start the Car (1992)

Singles from A View from 3rd Street
- 1. "Baby, It's Tonight" Released: March 1990; 2. "Time for Letting Go" Released: July 1990; 3. "House Full of Reasons" Released: October 1990

A View from 3rd Street is the second solo album by American singer-songwriter Jude Cole. Released on March 27, 1990, by Reprise Records, three years after his self-titled debut, the album spawned Cole's biggest single, "Baby, It's Tonight", which peaked at number 16 on the Billboard Hot 100. The album's follow-up single, "Time for Letting Go" peaked within the top 40 of the chart, while its third, "House Full of Reasons", entered the top 70.

A View from 3rd Street was met with largely positive critical reception, although its commercial response was mediocre, only peaking at number 138 on the Billboard 200 (on the issue dated June 5, 1990). It became Cole's first and highest-charting entry.

Production was handled by Canadian record producer David Tyson, who won the Jack Richardson Producer of the Year Award at the 1991 Juno Awards for his work on the album. Country singer Billy Ray Cyrus released a cover of "Time for Letting Go" in 1998, which entered Billboard's Hot Country Songs chart.

== Reception ==
Professional ratings
Review scores
Source	Rating
AllMusic	4/5 stars

Billboard highlighted the album’s polished adult-leaning pop-rock production, noting that Cole’s songwriting demonstrated a mature sense of melody and structure compared to his 1987 debut. The magazine also emphasized the commercial potential of its lead singles, identifying “Baby, It's Tonight” and “Time for Letting Go” as standout tracks for radio formats targeting adult contemporary and pop audiences.

Cash Box praised Cole’s performances and arrangements, stating that the album blended mainstream pop accessibility with a strong rock sensibility and well-crafted vocal delivery. The magazine singled out the album’s guitar-driven production and melodic hooks as strengths, viewing the project as a significant artistic advancement for Cole.

== Track listing ==
All tracks are written by Jude Cole, except where noted.

Side one
No.	Title	Writer(s)	Length
1.	"Hallowed Ground"	Jude Cole; George Green	5:19
2.	"Baby, It's Tonight"		3:40
3.	"House Full of Reasons"		3:56
4.	"Get Me Through the Night"		4:16
5.	"Time for Letting Go"		4:18

Side two
No.	Title	Writer(s)	Length
6.	"Stranger to Myself"	Cole; David Tyson	3:58
7.	"This Time It's Us"		4:35
8.	"Heart of Blues"		4:59
9.	"Compared to Nothing"		4:10
10.	"Prove Me Wrong"		4:49
Total length:			43:59

== Personnel ==
Adapted from the album's liner notes.

- Jude Cole – lead vocals, backing vocals, electric guitars, acoustic guitars, slide guitar, guitar solos, bass (2, 3, 10), piano (9)
- David Tyson – keyboards, piano, organ, harmonium, drum programming
- Tim Pierce – additional rhythm guitar (1, 2, 4, 5, 7)
- Leland Sklar – bass (1, 4–9)
- Pat Mastelotto – drums (1–8, 10), percussion
- Jeff Porcaro – drums (9)
- Larry Williams – saxophone (8)
- E.G. Daily – backing vocals (4, 8)

=== Technical ===
- Produced by David Tyson
- Executive producer – Michael Ostin
- Recorded by Greg Droman
- Mixed by Chris Lord-Alge
- Arranged by Jude Cole, David Tyson, and John Corey (3)
- Assistant engineers – Bill Malina, Steve Montgomery, Stephen Harrison, Don Mack, Jeff Frickman, Robert Hart, Chris Puram, and Micajah Ryan
- Mastered by Stephen Marcussen at Precision Lacquer (Hollywood, California)
- Project coordinator – Shari Sutcliffe
- Photography – Alberto Tolot
- Art direction – Maura P. McLaughlin
- Management – Michèle Martin/Ed Leffler (Final Cut Productions)

== Charts ==
Chart (1990)	Peak position
Canada Top Albums/CDs (RPM)	35
US Billboard 200	138
