= Ron Aniello =

American record producer

- Born: Ronald John Aniello
- Origin: Las Vegas, Nevada, U.S.
- Genres: Rock; pop; gospel; Christian; country
- Occupations: Record producer; composer; songwriter; arranger
- Instruments: Piano; keyboards; synthesizers; guitar; mandolin
- Labels: DreamWorks; Capitol; Geffen; Universal; Sony; Warner Bros.; Reprise; Lakeshore; 19; Jive
- Website: nettwerk.com/producer/ron-aniello/

Ron Aniello is an American songwriter, record producer, composer and musician. He is best known for his work with Bruce Springsteen, Matthew Koma, Shania Twain, Wanting Qu, Gavin DeGraw, Lifehouse, Patti Scialfa, Barenaked Ladies, Guster, Jars of Clay, Bridgit Mendler, Sixpence None the Richer, Jude Cole, Vanessa Amorosi, and Moshav Band. In addition, Aniello has composed scores for film and television, and the Ringling Bros. and Barnum and Bailey Circus, and has been nominated for Grammy Awards.

In 2013, he produced Wanting Qu's Say the Words, which produced three hit singles in Asia. Both Aniello and Wanting were nominated for a GMA as producers of "Love Ocean" for single of the year.

In January 2014, his work on Springsteen's High Hopes was number 1 in 22 countries including the United States and the UK with a four-star review from Rolling Stone magazine. Aniello's latest work includes co-writing Tiësto's "Written in Reverse" with Hardwell featuring Matthew Koma on A Town Called Paradise released June 13, 2014, in the UK and debuting at number 3.

== Selected work ==
Year	Artist	Album or Song Title(s)	Role
1995	Jude Cole	I Don't Know Why I Act This Way	Producer/Engineer
1998	Jude	No One Is Really Beautiful	Producer/Mastering
1999	Kendall Payne	Jordan's Sister	Producer/Engineer
2000	Juana Molina	Segundo	Producer/Engineer/Mastering
2000	Ian Hunter	"Good Man in a Bad Time" from Once Bitten Twice Shy	Co-Writer
2000	Lifehouse	No Name Face	Producer/Engineer
2000	Shannon McNally	Boulder Than Paradise EP	Producer/Engineer
2001	Jude	King of Yesterday	Producer/Engineer
2001	Days of the New	Days of the New	Producer/Engineer
2002	Lifehouse	Stanley Climbfall	Producer/Engineer/Co-Writer
2002	Shannon McNally	Jukebox Sparrows	Producer/Engineer/Co-Writer
2002	Sixpence None the Richer	"Waiting on the Sun" from Divine Discontent	Producer/Engineer/Co-Writer
2002	Loudermilk	The Red Record (Only selected tracks)	Producer/Engineer
2003	Guster	Keep It Together	Producer/Engineer/Co-Writer
2003	Barenaked Ladies	Everything to Everyone	Producer/Engineer
2003	Matt Nathanson	Beneath These Fireworks	Producer/Engineer
2003	Jars of Clay	Who We Are Instead	Producer/Engineer/Co-Writer
2004	Lifehouse	"Everybody Is Someone" from Wicker Park Soundtrack	Producer/Engineer/Co-Writer
2006	Guster	Ganging Up on the Sun (Only 6 tracks)	Producer
2006	Leigh Nash	"Never Finish" from Blue on Blue	Co-Writer
2006	Jars of Clay	"Water Under the Bridge", "There Is a River", & "Take Me Higher" from Good Monsters	Co-Writer
2006	Jeremy Camp	Beyond Measure	Producer/Engineer/Co-Writer
2006	Moshav	Misplaced	Producer/Engineer/Co-Writer
2007	Justin King	Fall/Rise	Producer
2007	Patti Scialfa	Play It As It Lays	Co-Producer
2007	Ashley Tesoro	Ashley Tesoro EP	Producer
2008	Vanessa Amorosi	Somewhere in the Real World (Only 7 tracks)	Producer/Co-Writer
2008	Candlebox	Into the Sun	Producer
2009	Jeremy Riddle	The Now And Not Yet	Producer
2009	Allison Iraheta	Trouble Is	Co-Producer/Co-Writer
2009	Camera Can't Lie	Days and Days EP	Producer
2010	Ashley Tesoro	Oh You Angel EP	Producer
2010	Camera Can't Lie	Upcoming Full Length	Producer
2011	Gavin DeGraw	"Stealing", "You Know Where I'm At" from Sweeter	Producer
2012	Bruce Springsteen	Wrecking Ball	Producer
2012	Ashley Tesoro	Simply Worship EP	Producer
2014	Bruce Springsteen	High Hopes	Producer
2014	Tiësto	Written in Reverse (feat. Matthew Koma)	Co-Producer/Co-Writer
2017	Shania Twain	Now	Producer
2019	Bruce Springsteen	Western Stars	Producer
2020	Bruce Springsteen	Letter to You	Producer
2022	Bruce Springsteen	Only the Strong Survive	Producer
2025	Bruce Springsteen	Tracks II: The Lost Albums	Producer

== Honors and awards ==
=== Honors ===
- Singles
  - 2000 - "Hanging by a Moment"; No Name Face; Lifehouse - 2× Platinum
- Albums
  - 2000 - No Name Face; Lifehouse - 4× Platinum

=== Awards ===
- Grammy Awards
  - 2013 - Best Rock Album - Wrecking Ball - Nominated
  - 2013 - Best Rock Song - "We Take Care of Our Own" - Nominated
  - 2010 - Best Pop/Contemporary Gospel Album - The Long Fall Back to Earth; Jars of Clay; Essential Records - Nominated
- Dove Awards
  - 2010 - Pop/Contemporary Album of the Year - The Long Fall Back to Earth; Jars of Clay; Essential Records - Winner
  - 2007 - Rock/Contemporary Album of the Year - Good Monsters; Jars of Clay; Essential Records - Winner
  - 2003 - Modern Rock/Alternative Recorded Song of the Year - "Spin"; Stanley Climbfall; Lifehouse; Sparrow Records - Nominated
  - 2001 - Modern Rock Album of the Year - Jordan's Sister; Kendall Payne; Sparrow Records - Winner
