= BoJack Hates the Troops =

- BoJack Horseman episode
- BoJack (right) overhears a woman (left) mocking him whilst on the phone. The scene has been described as a way to look into the character of BoJack.
- Episode no.: Season 1 Episode 2
- Directed by: J. C. Gonzalez
- Written by: Raphael Bob-Waksberg
- Production code: 102
- Original release date: August 22, 2014
- Running time: 25 minutes

Guest appearances
- Rachel Bloom as Laura; Judy Greer as Pam; Wendie Malick as Beatrice Horseman; Minae Noji as Ayako

Episode chronology
← Previous "BoJack Horseman: The BoJack Horseman Story, Chapter One"	Next → "Prickly-Muffin"
- BoJack Horseman (season 1)

"BoJack Hates the Troops" is the second episode of the first season of the American animated television series BoJack Horseman. It was released in the United States, along with the rest of season one, via Netflix on August 22, 2014. The episode was written by series creator Raphael Bob-Waksberg and directed by J. C. Gonzalez. In the episode, BoJack unintentionally gets into an altercation with a war veteran over muffins. Following this, BoJack receives widespread backlash from the public, and must repair his reputation.

Rachel Bloom, Judy Greer, Wendie Malick, and Minae Noji provided voices in guest appearances in the episode. "BoJack Hates the Troops" was conceived early into the series' development, as a potential episode if it was picked up. A version of the episode was created for the series' pilot presentation. Upon reading the script, Will Arnett was convinced to join the series, as it had him "immediately laughing".

It was met with polarizing reviews from critics upon release, being labeled the worst episode of the season by some, and the best by others. The episode has been called a commentary on jingoism, and a parody of the "media crusade". Its premise has also been likened to those of a sitcom episode, such as Curb Your Enthusiasm.

== Plot ==
In a cold opening, BoJack goes to a bar for a drink, and is mocked by a group of young women. After BoJack insults one of them, the two end up having sex. Waking up, he finds his ghostwriter Diane and her fiancee Mr. Peanutbutter in his house. BoJack also discovers his roommate Todd has eaten all of his Toaster Strudels, and so he goes to the supermarket to buy more.

While at the market, BoJack gets into an altercation at a grocery store with a seal named Neal over muffins, particularly on who had "dibs" on the muffins. BoJack and Diane continue to write his memoir, where he tells Diane of his traumatic childhood. Before they can continue, BoJack discovers Neal has gotten the news involved, and is also both a Navy SEAL and a veteran of the Afghanistan war.

BoJack, trying to rectify the situation publicly, calls the news station; He only makes it worse when he tells them of how he ate all the muffins. In a separate interview, he implies all veterans are jerks, causing the muffins story to spread throughout Hollywood. BoJack hides at Diane's house until everyone forgets about the drama. BoJack's agent Princess Carolyn is able to get him a meeting with Neal, in which he will give him more muffins as an apology. Mr. Peanutbutter offers to host this meeting on his new reality series Mr. Peanutbutter and Jelly, an idea BoJack reluctantly agrees to.

During the meeting, Todd hands BoJack a bag of what is presumed to be muffins, but he instead gave BoJack stale bagels. Neal is offended at first, but is moved by the gesture once BoJack lies and claims the bagels are a metaphor for mistreated veterans. Diane and BoJack meet on the roof of Mr. Peanutbutter's house, where the two further discuss BoJack's childhood, particularly his parents.

== Production ==
"BoJack Hates the Troops" was first conceived as a potential episode during the series' early development. The original concept, titled "BoJack Supports the Troops!", contained many differences from the final version, including the Navy SEAL being a Greyhound, a name-mention of Fox News opposed to the final episode's parodic version, and a different resolution to the narrative. Raphael pitched BoJack Horseman to The Tornante Company, and they requested a script to help them "get [more into] the world". Raphael conceived several episode ideas, and wrote the script for "BoJack Hates the Troops" to "give context" to the first episode. Tornante requested them to make the episode the series' pilot, as they felt it was "more like an episode of television", since the series was originally "week to week".

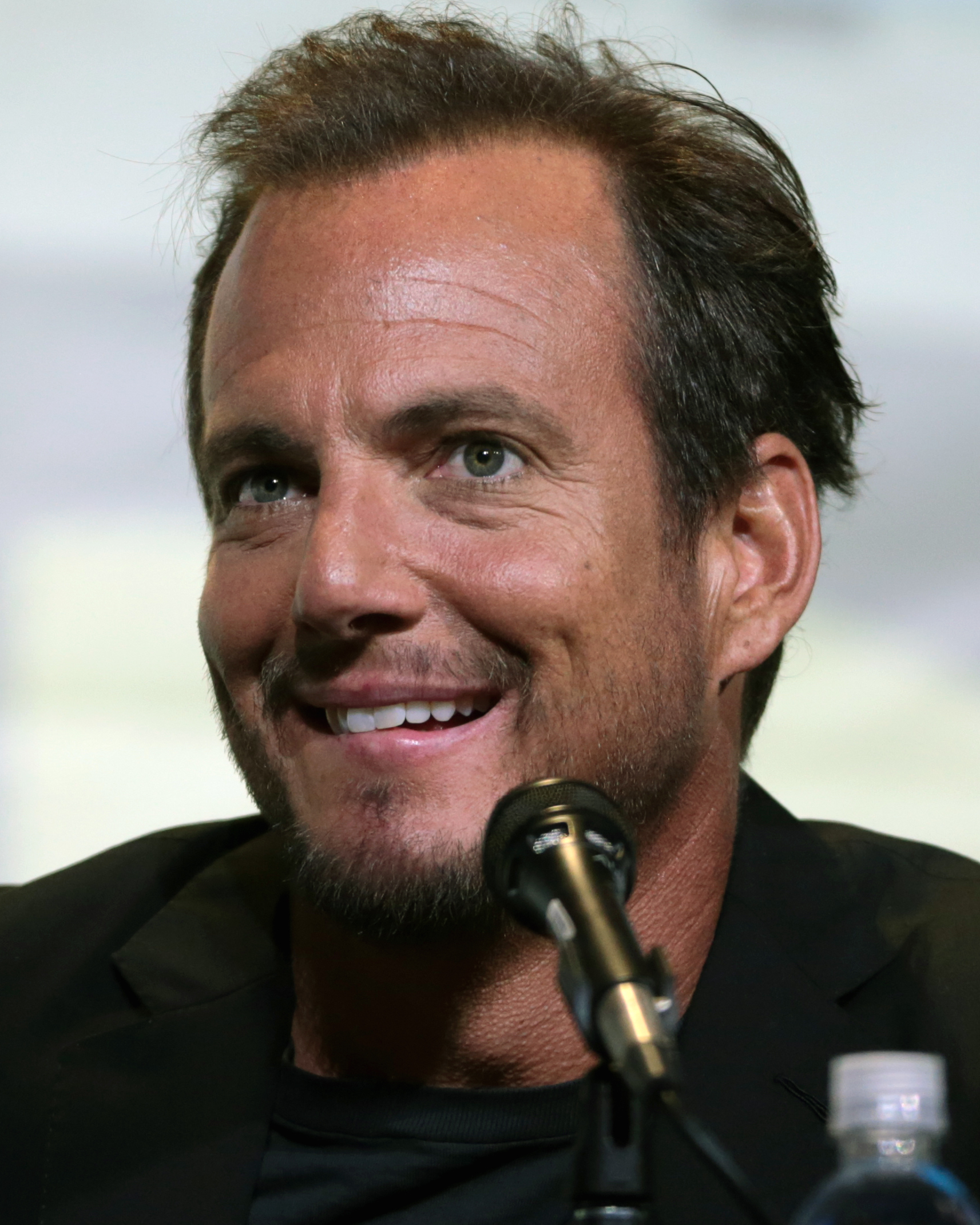
Will Arnett voices the series' titular BoJack Horseman.

To continue pitching the series to television companies, a ten minute pilot presentation version of "BoJack Hates the Troops" was created. The final episode's opening sequence was taken from the show's original pilot presentation. The character of Neal McBeal the Navy SEAL was changed from a Greyhound into his final design for the series' pilot presentation. Following Netflix's pick up of the series, Raphael decided to continue using the first episode's script as the pilot, instead. The pilot presentation version of the script for "BoJack Hates the Troops" was the first sent to Will Arnett, who provides the voice of BoJack. Arnett shared connections with Raphael in the industry, who gave him the episode's script; he was given a physical copy, and Arnett was "immediately laughing" upon reading it. After reading the script, Arnett asked his agent to get him an audition for the series. The table read for "BoJack Hates the Troops" was done subsequently following the first episodes.

One of the episode's guest stars, Judy Greer, arrived late to the first episode's read, but arrived on time for the second, which Raphael notes made them hesitant to pay her for both. According to Raphael, the first recording for the episode was between him, the producers, Mike Hollingsworth, and "probably" Michael Eisner. The lines for Amy Sedaris were recorded via phone call. Raphael was conscious about their guest stars early on, wanting the series to "[stand] on its own".

== Themes and analysis ==
"BoJack Hates The Troops” is the first instance of BoJack Horseman approaching territory beyond simple Hollywood satire... It’s interesting to view this early effort as a first step in that direction before the writers were sharp and bold enough to tackle the hard topics."

— Les Chappell,
Paste

Describing the general tone of the series, Christopher Hooton of The Independent explains that "[the show] is in part a commentary on the systematic character assassination of spiralling Hollywood stars a la Charlie Sheen and Lindsay Lohan". "BoJack Hates the Troops" served as a satiric commentary on patriotism and jingoism, tackling the notion that all veterans deserve to be supported. Critic Les Chappell of The A.V. Club listed the episode as the series' first "[exploration] into deeper controversies".

Additionally, Chappell has suggested the episode's mocking of the "media crusade" parodies news hosts who over rely on small controversies, and "devote every bit of air time to any [issue]". Critics have also noted the episode's sitcom-esque narrative. The premise of the episode has been likened to Curb Your Enthusiasm, with BoJack "getting himself into a bind and making it worse by virtue of his stubbornness". The cold opening of BoJack insulting the women at the bar has been called a way to look into BoJack's character, as his yelling has, as Chappell puts it, "something genuine [about] the way he tears into them".

BoJack's use of the word "troop" to describe the seal has been described as "[striking] a certain comedic note", due to his unintentional misuse of the phrase. "BoJack Hates the Troops" has been labeled an example of BoJack's conscientious nature and nihilism; it has been called a prelude to BoJack's visit with Herb in "The Telescope", setting up his selfishness.

== Release and reception ==
"BoJack Hates the Troops", along with the rest of season one, was released on the American streaming service Netflix on August 22, 2014. The episode was met with mixed reviews from critics. Kevin Zawacki of Paste Magazine stated that the episode was "funny at times". He thought it was better than the previous, but said it felt "largely passé", ultimately giving the episode a 7.2/10.

Willa Paskin of Slate used "BoJack Hates the Troops" as an example of one of the season's "engaging" episodes, praising its ability to "raise the point without haranguing its audience". Rob Humanick, another reviewer for Slant, listed it as the worst episode of the series, saying he "[loved] the episode", but felt it was still the weakest of the series.

Den of Geek called it the worst episode of season one. The review reiterated that it was "not awful", but claimed it seemed like a different show, not having the melancholy tone of other episodes. Les Chappell of The A.V. Club gave the episode a C+, calling it "commendable [for making] an effort to tackle a hot-button issue like supporting the military in its second episode", but critiqued it for making its stance on the issue unclear. Liam Gaughan of Collider was more favorable towards "BoJack Hates the Troops", calling it the best episode of season one.

"BoJack Hates the Troops", along with the rest of the first season, was released on DVD and Blu-Ray on July 30, 2019 in the BoJack Horseman: Seasons One & Two – Collectors Edition set.

== See also ==
- Support our troops
- United States Navy SEALs
