= That's Too Much, Man! =

- BoJack Horseman episode
- Sarah Lynn overdoses at the Griffith Observatory while hanging out with BoJack.
- Episode no.: Season 3 Episode 11
- Directed by: J.C. Gonzalez
- Written by: Elijah Aron; Jordan Young
- Original release date: July 22, 2016
- Running time: 26 minutes

Guest appearances
- Angela Bassett as Ana Spanakopita; Raphael Bob-Waksberg as Simon; Ilana Glazer as Penny Carson; Wiz Khalifa as himself; Kristen Schaal as Sarah Lynn; Neil deGrasse Tyson as Planetarium Narrator; Rufus Wainwright as Drinking Bird / The Obertones; Mara Wilson as Jill Pill / Quail Mother; Jeffrey Wright as Cuddlywhiskers / Father

Episode chronology
← Previous "It's You"	Next → "That Went Well"
- BoJack Horseman season 3

"That's Too Much, Man!" is the eleventh and penultimate episode of the third season of the American animated television series BoJack Horseman, and the 35th episode overall. It was directed by J.C. Gonzalez and written by Elijah Aron and Jordan Young, and was released in the United States, along with the rest of season three, via Netflix on July 22, 2016.

== Plot ==
Having been sober for 9 months, Sarah Lynn wakes up to a calm and positive life. BoJack calls Sarah for an invitation to a drinking party, and she quickly accepts, opens a bottle of vodka, and ends her 9-month sobriety. At night, having drunk excessive amounts of alcohol with Sarah, BoJack begins to experience blackouts.

Throughout the blackouts, the pair watch old episodes of Horsin' Around, visit an AA meeting where BoJack confesses his attempt to sleep with Penny, and visit the houses of Mr. Peanutbutter, Diane, Princess Carolyn, and Ana Spanakopita to make amends. While visiting Ana, BoJack experiences multiple blackouts while trying to hear a story about her lifeguard experience. After experiencing a two-week blackout, BoJack hears the story, in which Ana explains that she became a lifeguard after almost drowning, but was told by her instructor that there are people in this world one should not attempt saving, as they will pull you down in the long run.

After another blackout, BoJack is seen driving to Ohio with Sarah Lynn to make amends with Penny. The pair find Penny at a library and follow her to a school party, where they are caught by Penny when BoJack drunkenly trips over a group of boys. Scared, Penny distressedly tells the pair to leave. Driving home, Sarah Lynn finds the BoJack heroin BoJack had been given earlier that year. At home, the pair decide to snort the BoJack heroin, like "sophisticated adults", rather than inject it.

Now high, BoJack experiences a flashback to 2007, in which his former boss, Cuddlywhiskers, told him that The BoJack Horseman Show was gaining bad ratings and that they should cast Sarah Lynn as a guest star. In the present, Sarah Lynn learns that she has won the Oscar for Best Original Song. This saddens her, as she doesn't like who she is, so BoJack finally agrees to visit the Griffith Observatory with Sarah. Inside the building, Bojack nihilistically declares that seeing how "in the great, grand scheme of things, we're just tiny specks that will one day be forgotten", it is pointless to worry about one's mistakes in the past, or how one will be remembered. Listening to this, Sarah Lynn succumbs to a heroin overdose. BoJack nudges her shoulder and calls her name multiple times.

== Reception ==
=== Critical response ===
The episode received widespread acclaim from critics. Les Chappell, writing for The A.V. Club, gave the episode an A. He praised the development of BoJack's character, and the show's movement from a comedy to a drama, stating that "BoJack Horseman wants to believe that his life is a sitcom... but BoJack Horseman isn't even close to being a sitcom. For all its bright colors, absurd images, and a plethora of puns, it's a show whose path is littered with broken things, a dark and uncompromising world more on par with prestige cable dramas." Jenny Jaffe, writing for Vulture, gave the episode a rating of 5 out of 5 stars, lauding the ending of the episode, stating that "It is hard to imagine another show putting its characters through quite as much as BoJack [has] suffered over the past three seasons. More impressive is how the writers allow those choices to influence the way each character does or doesn't grow. 'That's Too Much, Man!' goes a step further still. If you thought BoJack's Oscar campaign might serve as the crux as the season, you severely underestimated just how dark this show can get." Sarah Manuszak, writing for The Bull & Bear, praised Sarah Lynn's character development, stating that "Until her death, Sarah Lynn did not get the chance to live her own life." Valerie Ettenhofer, writing for Film School Rejects, noted that this episode was the "Tragic Centerpiece of BoJack Horseman".

=== Accolades ===
For her performance as Sarah Lynn in the episode, Kristen Schaal received a nomination at the 69th Primetime Emmy Awards for Outstanding Character Voice-Over Performance.
