= Escape from L.A. (BoJack Horseman) =

- BoJack Horseman episode
- Episode no.: Season 2 Episode 11
- Directed by: Amy Winfrey
- Written by: Joe Lawson
- Original release date: July 17, 2015
- Running time: 26 minutes

Guest appearances
- Olivia Wilde as Charlotte; Ed Helms as Kyle; Adam Pally as Trip; Ilana Glazer as Penny

Episode chronology
← Previous "Yes And"	Next → "Out to Sea"
- BoJack Horseman season 2

"Escape from L.A." is the eleventh and penultimate episode of the second season of American animated television series BoJack Horseman, and the 23rd episode overall. It was written by Joe Lawson and directed by Amy Winfrey, and was released in the United States, along with the rest of season two, via Netflix on July 17, 2015. Olivia Wilde, Ed Helms, Adam Pally, and Ilana Glazer provide guest voices.

In the episode, BoJack visits his old friend Charlotte Moore in hopes of starting a relationship with her, only to find that she already has a family. He begins to bond with the family anyway, ultimately leading to disastrous and horrifying results.

This episode's title sequence is replaced with a special one set to "Kyle and the Kids", a parody of the Full House opening credits theme "Everywhere You Look".

== Plot ==
BoJack (Will Arnett) arrives in Tesuque, New Mexico, come morning time to surprise Charlotte (Olivia Wilde), a woman he knew in his early acting days with whom he desires to live happily ever after. To his shock, Charlotte is happily married and has two teenage children. BoJack buys a yacht as a cover story for being in New Mexico, which he christens the Escape from L.A.. Charlotte convinces him to stay for a few days, which becomes two months. BoJack has integrated himself well into the family, sleeps in his yacht parked in the driveway, and has completely abandoned his responsibility to film Secretariat.

Penny (Ilana Glazer), Charlotte's 17-year-old daughter, is upset her crush rejected her invitation to prom. BoJack offers to go as her surrogate date in order to spite him. They go to prom on a double date with Penny's friends Maddy (Ali Wong) and her boyfriend Pete (Jermaine Fowler). BoJack supplies the group with bourbon whiskey en route. At prom, Maddy gets increasingly drunk, Penny gets sad seeing her crush with a date, and BoJack gets booed off the dance floor after he attempts to gets the crowd to "do the Bojack."

BoJack tells them young people have freedom which adults never tell them about until it's "too late". They decide to leave the prom, driving out to the desert. They release balloons tied to glow sticks into the night sky and BoJack slow dances with Penny. Maddy passes out; fearing that she might have alcohol poisoning, the group rush her to the hospital. BoJack abandons Maddy and Pete at the hospital, manipulating Pete to lie so BoJack is not held responsible, and he and Penny drive home.

At home, Penny tells BoJack he is the only adult who doesn't infantilize her and sexually propositions him, rationalizing that she is above the age of consent in New Mexico. He tells her that she is too young to know what she wants, and she cries and goes inside her house. BoJack goes to the backyard, where Charlotte is sitting. BoJack says he does not know what to do with his life, and Charlotte tells him that where you are cannot change who you are. They kiss in the heat of the moment, but Charlotte quickly realizes it was a mistake and tells BoJack to leave in the morning. Defeated, BoJack goes to his yacht, where Penny propositions him again, only for him to reject her once more. However, Charlotte notices one of the balloons with a glow stick tied to it followed by her hearing voices inside the yacht, climbs up the ladder, opens the door, and finds BoJack and Penny in a compromising position. Outraged, she sends Penny to her room (though doesn't shame her). While Bojack tries to apologize to Charlotte, she cuts him off mid-sentence and harshly demands he leaves immediately and never contact them again under threat of her murdering him.

BoJack has his boat driven to Los Angeles, where his house is in the same (if not worse) disrepair he had left it in. On the balcony, he finds Diane (Alison Brie) still squatting at his house wallowing in self-pity.

== Analysis and significance ==
=== Continuity significance ===
Like every penultimate episode of a BoJack Horseman season, "Escape from L.A." is particularly significant, and leaves the title character in a difficult place. BoJack ends the episode at a low point, as his time in New Mexico proves to be a major source of remorse that will haunt him for the rest of the series. In "Start Spreading the News" (S3E01), he partly confesses what happened in New Mexico to a journalist. This confession, recorded without BoJack noticing, is then played to Diane in season 5, which leads to the deterioration of their friendship. In "That's Too Much, Man!" (S3E11) BoJack travels to Oberlin, Ohio with Sarah Lynn, trying to make amends to Penny. He fails to do so, reopening Penny's wounds instead. In the same episode, BoJack gives Penny's complete name at an AA meeting; in season 6, this will lead journalists Paige Sinclair and Maximilian Banks to Penny while investigating Sarah Lynn's death. In "A Quick One, While He's Away" (S6E08), BoJack's half-sister Hollyhock meets Pete Repeat at a party. He describes his recollection of the events on prom night, mentioning Maddy's alcohol poisoning and describing BoJack as "some shitty dude". This proves to be a major setback in BoJack's relationship with Hollyhock, and eventually leads to her cutting him out of her life entirely.

== Reception ==
"Escape from L.A." received critical acclaim. Caroline Framke of The A.V. Club gave the episode an "A" grade, describing it as a series standout, and as a risky and "unequivocal condemnation of its main character". In Paste, Julie Kliegman gives the episode a 9.3 rating, saying that "BoJack's lovable loser status is gone, probably for good. Some mistakes are too big to laugh off."
