= Edlow =

Edlow is a surname. Notable people with the surname include:

- Fielding Edlow (fl. 2008), American comedian, actress, and writer
- Joseph Edlow (born 1981), American lawyer
