= Brand New Couch =

- BoJack Horseman episode
- Episode no.: Season 2 Episode 1
- Directed by: Amy Winfrey
- Written by: Raphael Bob-Waksberg
- Original release date: July 17, 2015
- Running time: 26 minutes

Guest appearance
- George Takei as Podcast/Audiobook Narrator

Episode chronology
← Previous "Later"	Next → "Yesterdayland"
- BoJack Horseman season 2

"Brand New Couch" is the second season premiere of the American animated television series BoJack Horseman, and the 13th episode overall. It was written by Raphael Bob-Waksberg and directed by Amy Winfrey, and was released in the United States, along with the rest of season two, via Netflix on July 17, 2015. George Takei provides his voice in a guest appearance in the episode.

In 2015, the episode was nominated for Best Animated Television Production at the 43rd Annie Awards.

== Plot ==
The season's first episode picks up shortly after the season one finale. BoJack decides to adopt a positive life attitude, hoping to turn his life around, but it affects his job performance where he is starring in the title role of the Secretariat movie.
