= BoJack Horseman: The BoJack Horseman Story, Chapter One =

- BoJack Horseman episode
- Episode no.: Season 1 Episode 1
- Directed by: Joel Moser
- Written by: Raphael Bob-Waksberg
- Original release date: August 22, 2014
- Running time: 25 minutes

Episode chronology
← Previous —	Next → "BoJack Hates the Troops"
- BoJack Horseman season 1

"BoJack Horseman: The BoJack Horseman Story, Chapter One" is the series premiere and the first episode of the first season of the American animated television series BoJack Horseman. It was written by Raphael Bob-Waksberg and directed by Joel Moser. The episode was released in the United States, along with the rest of season one, via Netflix on August 22, 2014.

The episode introduces the title character, BoJack Horseman, an anthropomorphic horse, living on residuals after starring in a 1990s sitcom, Horsin' Around. More than 20 years after the show's end, BoJack plans to return to his former celebrity status, and with the assistance of his agent Princess Carolyn, ghostwriter Diane Nguyen, and roommate Todd Chavez, tries to write a memoir.

== Plot ==
The series' first episode follows BoJack as he tries to revive his dormant acting career. After a breakup with his girlfriend, Princess Carolyn, the night before, BoJack wakes up hungover. Princess Carolyn, who is also his talent agent, encourages him to write a celebrity tell-all. BoJack struggles to begin the book until he meets ghostwriter Diane Nguyen at a party and the two agree to work together to tell his story. BoJack also discovers, to his disappointment, that Diane is dating Mr. Peanutbutter, his former sitcom rival.

== Production ==
The episode was written by series creator Raphael Bob-Waksberg and directed by Joel Moser.

The episode premiered on Netflix, along with the rest of season one, on August 22, 2014. It was released on DVD and Blu-ray on July 30, 2019, in the BoJack Horseman: Seasons One & Two – Collector's Edition set.

== Reception ==
Les Chappell rated the episode as B− and said it suffered from "structural issues". Kevin Zawacki of Paste opined that the episode was an "exercise in squandered potential, with uninspired humor and flat dialogue blotting out a strong cast and pedigree".

Rob Humanick of Slant Magazine ranked the episode 74th out of the 77 episodes of the show and said that it "had the difficult task of establishing the show's very particular tone".

Alec Bojalad of Den of Geek said that upon rewatching season 1 this episode made him realise the show "gets off to a stronger start than I remembered", and that the episode has 203 jokes, meaning an average of 8.06 jokes per minute. Daniel Kurland of Den of Geek said that the episode "It's cutaway heavy, but of a motivated, smart variety, in spite of the show still indulging in them a lot…particularly in the pilot, where there's maybe six separate "Ten Minutes Later" cutaways." He also said it shared similarities with American Dad!.

Nehal Amer argues that the episode's blurring of two narratives is a "stylistic bleed" that signals a "thematic one" that "the show is revealed to not be as steeped in nihilism as its first episode suggests. BoJack Horseman's oscillation 'between irony and enthusiasm, between sarcasm and sincerity' suggests that it is not simply postmodern but something beyond that— metamodern".
