= BoJack Horseman season 1 =

BoJack Horseman
- Season 1
- Season 1 promotional poster
- Starring: Will Arnett; Amy Sedaris; Alison Brie; Paul F. Tompkins; Aaron Paul
- No. of episodes: 12

Release
- Original network: Netflix
- Original release: August 22, 2014

Season chronology
- Next → Season 2

The first season of the animated television series BoJack Horseman premiered exclusively via Netflix's web streaming service on August 22, 2014. The season consists of 12 episodes.

While the first half of the season received mixed reviews, the second half garnered much more positive reviews. Ben Travers of IndieWire believed one possible reason for mixed reviews of the show was critics reviewing only the first half of the season, noting the increase in quality of the second half and stating that it "saved the series from mediocrity". Critics cited the seventh episode, "Say Anything", as being the turning point of the season, with it changing drastically in tone and developing a darker, deeper meaning. This change was so drastic it resulted in IndieWire changing its policy to only review entire seasons of shows on Netflix, instead of just the first six episodes, which would have boosted BoJack Horseman's C+ grade. This change in perception is starkly noticeable in the show's other seasons, which received critical acclaim on Rotten Tomatoes and Metacritic.

== Cast and characters ==
=== Main ===
- Will Arnett as BoJack Horseman and Butterscotch Horseman
- Amy Sedaris as Princess Carolyn and Sharona
- Alison Brie as Diane Nguyen, Joelle Clarke, and Vincent Adultman
- Paul F. Tompkins as Mr. Peanutbutter and Andrew Garfield
- Aaron Paul as Todd Chavez

=== Recurring ===
- Patton Oswalt as Pinky Penguin, Neal McBeal, Gary Nguyen, and Bob Maggot
- Rachel Bloom as Laura
- Wendie Malick as Beatrice Horseman
- Kristen Schaal as Sarah Lynn
- Stanley Tucci as Herb Kazzaz
- Margo Martindale as herself
- Olivia Wilde as Charlotte Moore
- Chris Cox as Tina The Bear / various
- J. K. Simmons as Lenny Turteltaub
- Dave Segal as Paparazzi Robin
- Adam Conover as Paparazzi Blue Jay, A Ryan Seacrest Type, and Bradley Hitler-Smith
- Keith Olbermann as Tom Jumbo Grumbo
- Cedric Yarbrough as Officer Meow Meow Fuzzyface
- Raphael Bob-Waksberg as Charley Witherspoon and various characters

=== Guest ===
- Nicholas Gonzalez as Cartel Man
- Judy Greer as Pam
- Aisha Tyler as Sextina Aquafina and Carol Himmelfarb-Richardson
- Wyatt Cenac as Wayne
- Mike O'Malley as Artie Nguyen
- Melissa Leo as Ma Nguyen
- Kelen Coleman as Zoë and Zelda
- Yvette Nicole Brown as Beyoncé
- Chris Parnell as Klaus (Aryan Gang Leader) and News Reporter
- Horatio Sanz as Aldo (Latin Kings Gang Leader)
- Stephen Colbert as Mr. Witherspoon
- Kristin Chenoweth as Vanessa Gekko
- Kevin Bigley as Quentin Tarantulino and Dick Cavett
- Chris Cox as Marv Sbarbori / various
- Anjelica Huston as Angela Diaz
- Fielding Edlow as Roxy
- Naomi Watts as herself
- Wallace Shawn as himself
- Ken Jeong as Dr. Allen Hu
- John Krasinski as Secretariat
- Keegan-Michael Key as Sebastian St. Clair
- Maria Bamford as Kelsey Jannings

== Episodes ==
BoJack Horseman season 1 episodes
No. overall	No. in season	Title	Directed by	Written by	Original release date	Prod. code
1	1	"BoJack Horseman: The BoJack Horseman Story, Chapter One"	Joel Moser	Raphael Bob-Waksberg	August 22, 2014	101
Washed-up horse 1990s sitcom actor BoJack Horseman seeks to write an autobiography to reignite his fame, but is too lazy to do so, so his publisher assigns him a ghostwriter, Diane Nguyen. Initially unwilling to meet with her, he invites her to a quinceañera his slacker roommate Todd Chavez throws at his house to pay off a cartel, and is surprised to find that they connect. However, he learns that she is dating his longtime rival and fellow sitcom actor, dopey Labrador retriever Mr. Peanutbutter.
2	2	"BoJack Hates the Troops"	J.C. Gonzalez	Raphael Bob-Waksberg	August 22, 2014	102
BoJack ignites a media firestorm when he fights with a Navy SEAL over a box of muffins and calls the troops "jerks" on live TV. His Persian cat agent and ex-girlfriend Princess Carolyn plans to resolve the issue by making him go on Mr. Peanutbutter's reality TV show and apologize to the SEAL with replacement muffins, which almost goes poorly until Mr. Peanutbutter unintentionally distracts those present with his antics. BoJack finds Diane on the roof, and she asks him to start being honest about himself, which he promises to do.
3	3	"Prickly-Muffin"	Martin Cendreda	Raphael Bob-Waksberg	August 22, 2014	103
In flashbacks to BoJack's old show Horsin' Around, he neglects the emotions of his young costar Sarah Lynn and instills in her the message to never stop performing. In the present day, Sarah Lynn is a floundering pop star that BoJack takes in after her boyfriend Andrew Garfield breaks up with her, and she begins to manipulate him through his guilt and desire for a family, allowing her to do whatever she wants. While living with him, she informs him that Horsin' Around creator Herb Kazzaz has terminal cancer. The two end up having sex, but BoJack ultimately realizes he is the one taking advantage of her; he tries to get her help, but she leaves before he can right his wrong. Upon Sarah Lynn's departure he rationalizes that because everyone is a product of their own environment there's no consequences for one's actions.
4	4	"Zoës and Zeldas"	Amy Winfrey	Peter A. Knight	August 22, 2014	104
In 1985, BoJack meets and befriends Herb while failing at standup. In the present, after Diane questions the origin of his relationship with Todd, BoJack decides to help Todd work on the rock opera he has always wanted to make. When Todd finds actual success and posits moving out, BoJack panics and utilizes Margo Martindale to manipulate Todd into buying an addictive video game, causing him to underperform at an investor's showcase and ruin his pitch. Diane's BuzzFeed columnist ex-boyfriend pretends to work on an article about Mr. Peanutbutter but really uses it as an excuse to try and get back together with her, warning her that she and Mr. Peanutbutter are incompatible. Guest starring: Margo Martindale as herself
5	5	"Live Fast, Diane Nguyen"	Joel Moser	Caroline Williams	August 22, 2014	105
While out east to visit BoJack's publisher, Diane learns that her cruel father has died. She takes him to Boston for the funeral, only for her lazy, immature family to make her pay for it herself and then not bother to show up, having their father's body turned into chum. Diane leaves enraged, but BoJack follows and comforts her, and the two return home. BoJack calls Herb before they leave, but is forced to leave a message when Herb doesn't answer his call. Todd turns BoJack's house into a cash grab by pretending it is the home of David Boreanaz, but is quickly caught and arrested. He calls BoJack in jail, but nobody answers. Guest starring: Ira Glass as Diane's ringtone
6	6	"Our A-Story is a 'D' Story"	J.C. Gonzalez	Scott Marder	August 22, 2014	106
BoJack develops feelings for Diane after returning from Boston, leading him to drunkenly steal the "D" from the Hollywood Sign as a grand romantic gesture. Knowing he needs to get rid of it, he enlists Mr. Peanutbutter for help, only for him to take all the credit for the theft. As BoJack leaves an honest, intimate voicemail for Diane, Mr. Peanutbutter privately proposes to her, only to make a spectacle of it when she accepts. BoJack convinces Diane to delete the voicemail without listening to it when she calls him back. Todd is courted by the Aryan Brotherhood and Latin Kings in prison, only to get them to reconcile their differences and escape when a helicopter returning the "D" crashes into the prison wall. Guest starring: Yvette Nicole Brown as Beyoncé, Chris Parnell as Aryans Gang Member, and Horatio Sanz as Latin Kings Leader.
7	7	"Say Anything"	Martin Cendreda	Joe Lawson	August 22, 2014	107
Princess Carolyn's agency merges with her rival Vanessa Gekko's, who takes her office and client. She tries to get BoJack to do a commercial, but he is more interested in romantically pursuing her, forcing her to get Todd to do it. After Gekko one-ups her multiple times, Princess Carolyn finally succumbs to BoJack's advances and goes on a date with him, only for him to get a foreboding call back from Herb and abandon the date, hurting her. She formulates a plot to lure her former client away from Gekko's project; the plot is successful, and Gekko is fired. Princess Carolyn gives a director the idea to make a movie about the Hollywood Sign and convinces him to hire BoJack, only to get a forlorn call from BoJack as he returns from Herb's house. As Princess Carolyn looks out her office window at the city below, her phone wishes her a happy fortieth birthday.
8	8	"The Telescope"	Amy Winfrey	Mehar Sethi	August 22, 2014	108
In flashbacks to the eighties and nineties, BoJack and Herb are bartenders and aspiring comedians when Herb gets Horsin' Around greenlit by ABC. At the Griffith Observatory, Herb gives Bojack a telescope to signify their bond. As the two grow apart over the years, Herb is outed as gay and BoJack reluctantly lets the network fire him after being offered the chance to play his hero Secretariat in a biopic, which was never made. In the present, BoJack takes Diane with him to prevent him from being alone with Herb, who is passive-aggressive with BoJack despite clearly still sharing kinship with him. Before leaving, Diane encourages BoJack to talk to Herb privately; BoJack apologizes to Herb for betraying him, but Herb refuses to forgive him, on account of him waiting until Herb was on his deathbed to try to make amends. BoJack tries to take the telescope and the two fight, breaking it in the process, prompting Herb to call him cowardice who's apathetic to who Bojack has to hurt in order to get what Bojack wants. Bojack receives the call from Princess Carolyn on the way home. As Diane assures BoJack that he did the right thing by apologizing, he kisses her and she pushes him off.
9	9	"Horse Majeure"	Joel Moser	Peter A. Knight	August 22, 2014	109
Princess Carolyn starts dating "Vincent Adultman", a man who only BoJack recognizes as three boys in a trench coat. Wanting to disrupt the upcoming wedding between Diane and Mr. Peanutbutter, he hires Martindale to stage a bank robbery, but only ends up moving the wedding up and getting her arrested. Todd becomes Mr. Peanutbutter's driver at BoJack's urging, but turns on BoJack when he realizes he was the one who sabotaged his rock opera; he decides not to tell BoJack when Mr. Peanutbutter confesses his doubts about having a third wife. At the wedding, Diane assures BoJack that things are fine between them. BoJack confides in Vincent that he feels as though he may never have the chance to be good again.
10	10	"One Trick Pony"	J.C. Gonzalez	Laura Gutin Peterson	August 22, 2014	110
Two months later, BoJack has been cast as Mr. Peanutbutter in the movie about the Hollywood Sign and strikes up a relationship with Naomi Watts, who is playing Diane. Todd gains the director's favor and begins changing the movie's script to make BoJack out to be the villain of the story, eventually taking apart the movie entirely. When BoJack confronts him, Todd reveals he had no malicious intentions, but does not forgive BoJack, and Watts explains that she only slept with him to stay in character. Diane shows BoJack her current draft of his book, which he feels makes him look bad and insults it. Angry, Diane gets her ex-boyfriend to publish a teaser from it on BuzzFeed. The teaser receives positive feedback, but BoJack fires Diane anyway for leaking the draft. Guest starring: Wallace Shawn as himself, Naomi Watts as herself
11	11	"Downer Ending"	Amy Winfrey	Kate Purdy	August 22, 2014	111
BoJack promises his publisher to write a better book than Diane, but finds himself struggling to start. He, Todd, and Sarah Lynn take drugs together and write a gibberish book, and Todd admits he does not care about the loss of his rock opera because he did not expect anything better from BoJack. BoJack begins to have visions of Diane and Horsin' Around while trying to reach a conclusion about his self-worth, and he has a flashback to his mother Beatrice forcing on him the same advice he did Sarah Lynn. He imagines marrying Charlotte Moore, a deer who was close friends with him and Herb, and having a daughter with her, only to finally wake up from his hallucinations. He goes to Diane at a ghostwriter convention and admits her book is excellent. He begs her to tell him that he is a good person; Diane does not respond. Guest starring: Ken Jeong as Dr. Hu
12	12	"Later"	Martin Cendreda	Raphael Bob-Waksberg	August 22, 2014	112
In 1973, BoJack writes into The Dick Cavett Show while Secretariat is being interviewed, asking what he does when he feels sad. Secretariat tells BoJack to always keep running forward. One month later, Secretariat commits suicide after being banned from racing due to illegally gambling on races. Three months after the release of the book, BoJack wins a Golden Globe and convinces producer Lenny Turtletaub to finally greenlight the Secretariat biopic, with a woman named Kelsey Jannings directing and Andrew Garfield playing the lead. Diane is invited by eccentric billionaire Sebastian St. Clair to document his philanthropy in impoverished countries, which would require her to leave Los Angeles, and the U.S. as a whole for three months. Todd and Mr. Peanutbutter come up with a series of outlandish business ideas, one of which hospitalizes Garfield and gets BoJack the role of Secretariat. BoJack talks to Diane on her roof for the first time since he approached her at the convention, and she reveals she has been hired to work on the biopic. They discuss the true nature of happiness before BoJack admits he just wanted Diane to like him. BoJack visits the Griffith Observatory again, where he signs an autograph for a horse fan. Guest starring: John Krasinski as Secretariat

== Reception ==
The review aggregator Rotten Tomatoes reported a score of 71%, based on 28 reviews with an average rating of 5.9/10. The site's critical consensus states, "It's intermittently funny, but in most respects, BoJack Horseman pales in comparison to similar comedies." On Metacritic, the season received a rating of 59 out of 100, based on 13 critics, indicating "mixed or average reviews".

Erik Adams of The A.V. Club gave the first six episodes a C+ grade; in the review, Adams wrote that the show "spoofs the emptiness of celebrity, but does so without any novelty or true insight". At Slate, Willa Paskin was more enthused. "[It] is perhaps a little more clever than it is uproariously funny, but it is often very clever, and, moreover, well-tuned to the ludicrousness of the sort of low-level fame that surrounds BoJack". She likened it to 30 Rock in its ability to "[present] big ideas without having to commit to them". The New York Times described the show as "hilarious and ribald". Margaret Lyons of Vulture gave a positive review, describing it as "radically sad. I love it".

However, the second half of the season received much more positive reviews. Ben Travers of IndieWire believed one possible reason for mixed reviews of the show was critics reviewing only the first half of the season, with the second half changing drastically in tone and developing a darker and deeper meaning. This change was so drastic it resulted in IndieWire changing its policy to only review entire seasons of shows on Netflix, instead of just the first six episodes, which would have boosted BoJack Horseman's C+ grade.
