= Out to Sea (BoJack Horseman) =

- BoJack Horseman episode
- Episode no.: Season 2 Episode 12
- Directed by: Mike Roberts
- Written by: Elijah Aron; Jordan Young
- Original release date: July 17, 2015
- Running time: 26 minutes

Guest appearances
- Lance Bass as Lance Bass; Jason Beghe as Jogger; John Cho as Lead Improv-er; Ricky Gervais as Hedgehog at Orphanage; Emily Heller as Female Improv-er; Rian Johnson as Bryan; Sarah Koenig as Diane's Ringtone; Liev Schreiber as Copernicus; Aisha Tyler as Sextina Aquafina

Episode chronology
← Previous "Escape from L.A."	Next → "Start Spreading the News"
- BoJack Horseman season 2

"Out to Sea" is the twelfth and final episode of the second season of American animated television series BoJack Horseman, and the 24th episode overall. It was written by Elijah Aron and Jordan Young and directed by Mike Roberts, and was released in the United States, along with the rest of season two, via Netflix on July 17, 2015. Lance Bass, Jason Beghe, John Cho, Ricky Gervais, Emily Heller, Rian Johnson, Sarah Koenig, Liev Schreiber, and Aisha Tyler provide voices in guest appearances in the episode.

== Plot ==
Returning to Hollywood, BoJack learns from Princess Carolyn that the Secretariat film was finished without him, with Lenny Turteltaub replacing the real BoJack with a CGI version. He manages to make enough money for the establishment of "The BoJack Horseman Orphanage" as part of a promise he made at Herb Kazzaz's funeral. Princess Carolyn and Rutabaga Rabbitowitz are close to opening their own agency. After moving out of BoJack's house, Todd finds himself trapped in the improv comedy cult.

== Reception ==
"Out to Sea" received mixed reviews from critics. Caroline Framke of AV Club gave the episode a "B" grade, saying the episode "feels like a series finale, but not necessarily a satisfying one". In Paste, Julie Kliegman notes the series' ending, saying "for such a dark series of episodes, the second season ends on a surprisingly high note." Likewise, Screen Rant's Kevin Yeoman praises the finale, writing that the closing scene "brings what was an incredibly solid second season to a close by allowing all characters ... to catch a glimpse of the light at the end of the a long tunnel, rather than continue to stare into the abyss that is their uniquely unsatisfactory lives."
