= BoJack Horseman season 2 =

BoJack Horseman
- Season 2
- Season 2 promotional poster
- Starring: Will Arnett; Amy Sedaris; Alison Brie; Paul F. Tompkins; Aaron Paul
- No. of episodes: 12

Release
- Original network: Netflix
- Original release: July 17, 2015

Season chronology
- ← Previous; Season 1 Next → Season 3

The second season of the animated television series BoJack Horseman premiered exclusively via Netflix's web streaming service on July 17, 2015. Like the first season, the second season also consists of 12 episodes.

== Cast and characters ==
=== Main ===
- Will Arnett as BoJack Horseman
- Amy Sedaris as Princess Carolyn
- Alison Brie as Diane Nguyen
- Paul F. Tompkins as Mr. Peanutbutter
- Aaron Paul as Todd Chavez

=== Recurring ===
- Maria Bamford as Kelsey Jannings / various
- Raphael Bob-Waksberg as Charley Witherspoon / various
- Kristin Chenoweth as Vanessa Gekko / Miss Teach-Bot
- Adam Conover as A Ryan Seacrest Type / various
- Patton Oswalt as Pinky Penguin / various
- Keegan-Michael Key as Sebastian St. Clair
- Kristen Schaal as Sarah Lynn / various
- J. K. Simmons as Lenny Turtletaub
- Cedric Yarbrough as Officer Meow-Meow Fuzzyface / various
- Lisa Kudrow as Wanda Pierce

=== Guest ===
- Alan Arkin as J.D. Salinger
- Brandon T. Jackson as Corduroy Jackson Jackson
- George Takei as Audiobook Narrator
- Joel McHale as Alex
- Stanley Tucci as Herb Kazzaz
- Henry Winkler as himself
- Paul McCartney as himself
- Ron Funches as Gentle Chickens Farmer
- Amy Schumer as Irving
- Craig Kilborn as Michael Morgan
- Philip Baker Hall as Hank Hippopopalous
- Scott Wolf as himself (fox caricature)
- Tatiana Maslany as Mia McKibbin
- Daniel Radcliffe as himself
- John Krasinski as Secretariat
- Ben Schwartz as Rutabaga Rabbitowitz
- Rian Johnson as Bryan
- Liev Schreiber as Copernicus
- Olivia Wilde as Charlotte
- Ed Helms as Kyle
- Adam Pally as Trip
- Ilana Glazer as Penny
- Ricky Gervais as Hedgehog at Orphanage
- Sarah Koenig as Diane's Ringtone
- Aisha Tyler as Sextina Aquafina
- Angela Bassett as Ana Spanikopita

== Episodes ==
BoJack Horseman season 2 episodes
No. overall	No. in season	Title	Directed by	Written by	Original release date	Prod. code
14	1	"Brand New Couch"	Amy Winfrey	Raphael Bob-Waksberg	July 17, 2015	201
In 1973, BoJack watches Secretariat read his letter (Note: As depicted in "Later".) while his parents fight in another room. Beatrice Horseman reminds him that he has "ruined" her, and that he must make something of himself to atone. During the success of Horsin' Around, she comes to one of his live shows, but is unimpressed. In the present, Secretariat begins shooting. BoJack, with a new, overly positive attitude, struggles to jog up a hill outside his house and film a serious line. As he worries over being unable to perform his dream role, Beatrice calls to inform him that she read his autobiography and apologizes for birthing him "broken," causing BoJack to drop his attitude and film the line perfectly. Guest starring: George Takei as Audiobook Narrator
15	2	"Yesterdayland"	J.C. Gonzalez	Peter A. Knight	July 17, 2015	202
BoJack finds himself frustrated with his recent dates, all of them more interested in his fame and reputation than him, until he meets Wanda Pierce, an owl network executive who just woke up from a thirty year coma. They begin dating, but he becomes jealous of her new friend, a man who also woke up from a coma but is secretly a KGB sleeper agent. Todd builds his own version of Disneyland after winning a legal battle with Disney, but becomes frustrated when Mr. Peanutbutter tries to take over. As the amusement park catches fire because of its shoddy construction, Mr. Peanutbutter saves Todd's life and BoJack assures Wanda that she makes him want to fix his jealous and negative impulses. Wanda accepts BoJack's offer to move in with him. Guest starring: Joel McHale as Alex and Lisa Kudrow as Wanda Pierce
16	3	"Still Broken"	Amy Winfrey	Mehar Sethi	July 17, 2015	203
Herb Kazzaz dies in a car crash after his cancer goes into remission, and the executor of his will sends BoJack and his Horsin' Around co-stars on a scavenger hunt. The group use their memories of Herb to discover that he left them a manuscript, but realize it has been stolen by Herb's friend Henry Winkler. They confronts Winkler, who explains that Herb's manuscript was awful and would ruin his reputation if it was published. Princess Carolyn tries to use the wake to get new clients, but is forced to improvise a friendship with Herb when Mr. Peanutbutter asks her to tell stories about him. Todd adopts a new, confident persona when BoJack orders him to go get soda, but quickly drops it when BoJack criticizes him. In a flashback to after the first shoot of Horsin' Around, BoJack expresses his fear of the future changing his friendship with Herb, but Herb reassures him that they will be fine. Guest starring: Stanley Tucci as Herb Kazzaz and Henry Winkler as himself
17	4	"After the Party"	J.C. Gonzalez	Joe Lawson	July 17, 2015	204
Mr. Peanutbutter throws Diane a lavish thirty-fifth birthday party against her wishes and the two get in a fight, ending the party early. Diane realizes Mr. Peanutbutter is trying to get her to not leave with Sebastian St. Clair, and after a long talk about his fear of being without her, he decides he is comfortable with her going. Princess Carolyn notices Vincent Adultman without his trench coat on the street, and he tries to convince her that it was actually his son. She breaks up with him, but never realizes the truth about what he really is. Todd watches as his and Princess Carolyn's phones fall in love, but his phone updates and deletes its feelings. While driving home from the party, BoJack and Wanda discuss their relationship; BoJack fears they are moving too fast. After BoJack hits a deer, he and Wanda take it to the hospital while she tells him two separate jokes about obsession that tie together in the end. Guest starring: Paul McCartney as himself
18	5	"Chickens"	Mike Roberts	Joanna Calo	July 17, 2015	205
Desperate to get Kelsey Jannings to like him, BoJack occupies the Secretariat crew for the day, but she is still annoyed by him. She pawns off her sardonic daughter onto Diane, who returns home to find Todd harboring a brain-damaged chicken that escaped from a fast food transport truck. They give the chicken to a farm that will treat her well before killing her for food, only for Todd and Diane to feel guilt and free all the chickens. They are caught and arrested, but BoJack uses his celebrity status to free them, further annoying Kelsey by making the situation about himself. Guest starring: Ron Funches as Gentle Chickens Farmer, Amy Schumer as Irving, Craig Kilborn as Michael Morgan
19	6	"Higher Love"	J.C. Gonzalez	Vera Santamaria	July 17, 2015	206
Princess Carolyn signs Mr. Peanutbutter on as a client after his agent dies of autoerotic asphyxiation. She tracks down the still alive J.D. Salinger and convinces him to pitch a celebrity quiz game show with Mr. Peanutbutter as the host. Despite her efforts, she continues to find herself unappreciated at her company. BoJack absentmindedly tells Wanda that he loves her and immediately takes it back, but is upset when she tells him she does not love him either. When BoJack's co-star Corduroy Jackson admits that he was formerly addicted to asphyxiation, BoJack gets the idea to pretend to do it himself and have Wanda save his life if she truly loves him. When BoJack accidentally does choke himself in front of Wanda, she saves him and admits she does love him. Later on the Secretariat set, BoJack finds Corduroy dead after trying to asphyxiate himself. Guest starring: Alan Arkin as J.D. Salinger The focus on auto-erotic asphyxiation, including two deaths in the episode, has meant that this is the only episode in the series to be given an 18 certificate by the British Board of Film Classification.
20	7	"Hank After Dark"	Amy Winfrey	Kelly Galuska	July 17, 2015	207
Diane and BoJack go on tour to promote his book, as production on Secretariat is temporarily halted due to Corduroy's death. During the tour, Diane brings up allegations of sexual misconduct towards beloved television icon Hank Hippopopalous, sparking immense backlash against her. She tries to get a magazine to run a story on him, but the corporation that owns the magazine relies on Hippopopalous' image and shuts the story down. With Mr. Peanutbutter upset with her for possibly jeopardizing his upcoming game show, Diane decides to join St. Clair in the country of Cordovia. The prince of Cordovia, who bears a resemblance to Todd, visits America, and the two briefly switch places. Todd sends Cordovia into chaos, while the prince finds himself disturbed by American culture. Guest starring: Scott Wolf as Scott Wolf (fox caricature), Philip Baker Hall as Hank Hippopopalous
21	8	"Let's Find Out"	Matt Mariska	Alison Flierl & Scott Chernoff	July 17, 2015	208
BoJack goes on Salinger's game show as a favor for Wanda, where he faces off against Daniel Radcliffe and is intentionally set up to lose. Todd finds himself at odds with a production assistant who wins Salinger's pen after solving a power outage, and he tricks her into giving him the pen. Princess Carolyn informs BoJack of a way to tell when Mr. Peanutbutter is reading the correct answer, but he is asked to throw the game by Wanda. BoJack purposely ties with Radcliffe instead of winning. The show gets derailed when BoJack insults Mr. Peanutbutter, who reveals that he knows BoJack kissed Diane. (Note: As depicted in "The Telescope".) Wanda orders them to make up by the end of the show, so BoJack admits he is envious of Mr. Peanutbutter's ability to be happy and they kiss on live television, as ordered by the producers. BoJack chooses to take a final question to double his winnings for charity and is asked one where Radcliffe is the answer. Angered by Radcliffe not recognizing him earlier, BoJack intentionally answers wrong out of spite and the money is burned. Guest starring: Daniel Radcliffe as himself, Alan Arkin as J.D. Salinger and Tatiana Maslany as Mia McKibbin
22	9	"The Shot"	Matt Mariska	Elijah Aron & Jordan Young	July 17, 2015	209
In 1972, BoJack smokes his first cigarette after seeing Secretariat smoke one on television. Beatrice catches him and forces him to smoke the rest of it while ordering him not to cry. In the present, the Secretariat producers decide to make the film more lighthearted, which BoJack and Kelsey object to. They agree to film the last shot of the movie: Secretariat learning his brother was killed in Vietnam after sending him in his stead, and do so by breaking into the Nixon Museum while Margo Martindale and Princess Carolyn distract the police. Princess Carolyn becomes lost in a Kinkade painting but ultimately realizes that she chose her chaotic life because she loves it, choosing to start her own agency and a romantic relationship with her divorced coworker Rutabaga Rabitowitz. Diane decides to leave Cordovia after realizing St. Clair is only helping because of his narcissism rather than out of the kindness, but does not tell Mr. Peanutbutter of her return. BoJack refuses to cry on camera, but Kelsey gets the shot without him crying and claims he had the emotion he needed in him all along. BoJack weeps outside while smoking a cigarette. The next day, Kelsey is fired for their efforts and replaced by another director. BoJack returns home to find Diane, who asks to stay with him. Guest starring: John Krasinski as Secretariat.
23	10	"Yes And"	J.C. Gonzalez	Mehar Sethi	July 17, 2015	210
BoJack clashes with the new Secretariat director's nonchalant attitude, and a miscommunication leads to the director getting offended and prolonging the shoot schedule out of spite, forcing BoJack to miss a chance to do theatre work in New York. Depressed and angry, he stays at home and drinks with Diane, to Wanda's and Princess Carolyn's dismay. BoJack and Wanda get into an argument when BoJack insults her profession, and they break up as a result of Bojack's bitterness and relentless self-pity. Todd joins an improv comedy club and excels. He saves a spot at his show for BoJack, who does not come. BoJack and Diane discuss if finishing the proper version of Secretariat or going to New York would have made him happy. After contemplating on the last time he was truly happy, BoJack drives to New Mexico to see Charlotte Moore. Diane calls Mr. Peanutbutter when BoJack urges her to tell him the truth; she instead requests he does not call her until she "returns" from Cordovia. Guest starring: Ben Schwartz as Rutabaga Rabbitowitz, Liev Schreiber as Copernicus and Rian Johnson as Bryan
24	11	"Escape from L.A."	Amy Winfrey	Joe Lawson	July 17, 2015	211
BoJack discovers that Charlotte is married and has two teenage children. He lies that he is in town for a boat show, and buys a boat which he names "Escape From L.A." to cover the lie. BoJack rejects all of his Hollywoo obligations and lives with Charlotte's family for two months as the family warms to him, particularly the daughter, Penny Carson. BoJack agrees to accompany Penny to her prom when she does not have a date. They have a fun evening with her friends until one of them passes out from alcohol poisoning; BoJack and Penny abandon her and go home, where she comes onto him. He rejects her and sits with Charlotte, where she states her belief that BoJack cannot escape who he is. They briefly kiss, but Charlotte quickly breaks it off and asks him to leave come morning time. As BoJack gets on the boat, Penny again tries to seduce him, and while he rejects her, he leaves the bedroom door open. Charlotte catches them about to have sex and harshly orders BoJack to leave immediately, demanding he never contact her or her family ever again. BoJack takes the boat with him back to California, where he finds Diane still at his house. Guest starring: Olivia Wilde as Charlotte, Ed Helms as Kyle, Adam Pally as Trip and Ilana Glazer as Penny The opening theme song is replaced by "Kyle and the Kids", a parody theme song summarizing Charlotte's living conditions.
25	12	"Out to Sea"	Mike Roberts	Elijah Aron & Jordan Young	July 17, 2015	212
Princess Carolyn learns that Rabitowitz is back with his wife despite him continuing to have sex with her. She fires him from the new company and chooses to run it herself, hiring Diane as a Twitter ghostwriter. Diane is spotted by Mr. Peanutbutter while out in public, and they agree for her to come home and pretend nothing happened. Todd joins the improv club's cruise ship and discovers their leader is a fraud. BoJack finds that he was replaced entirely in Secretariat by CGI. Lenny Turtletaub introduces BoJack to Ana Spanakopita, a publicist who plans to get him an Oscar. Disillusioned by people preferring the fake BoJack to him, he takes the Escape From L.A. to rescue Todd from the ship and learns that Princess Carolyn opened an orphanage in Herb's name using his Horsin' Around residuals. BoJack makes it up the hill outside his house and collapses from exhaustion, only for an elderly Japanese macaque who has been seen jogging throughout the season to advise him that "it gets a little easier, but you gotta do it every day," which BoJack seems to accept. Guest starring: Ricky Gervais as Hedgehog at Orphanage, Sarah Koenig as Diane's Ringtone, Aisha Tyler as Sextina Aquafina, Angela Bassett as Ana Spanikopita and Rian Johnson as Bryan

== Reception ==
On Rotten Tomatoes the second season holds an approval rating of 100%, based on 22 critics, with an average rating of 8.7/10. The site's critical consensus reads, "BoJack Horseman truly comes into its own during season two, maturing into an ambitious comedy that sensitively blends wackiness with dark, nuanced drama". On Metacritic, the season has a score of 90 out of 100, based on 7 critics, indicating "universal acclaim".
