= List of BoJack Horseman characters =

Main characters of BoJack Horseman (left to right: Diane Nguyen, Todd Chavez, BoJack Horseman, Princess Carolyn and Mr. Peanutbutter)

BoJack Horseman is an American adult animated sitcom created by Raphael Bob-Waksberg. The series stars Will Arnett as the title character, BoJack Horseman. The supporting cast includes Amy Sedaris, Alison Brie, Paul F. Tompkins, and Aaron Paul. The series' first season premiered on August 22, 2014, on Netflix, with a Christmas special premiering on December 19. The show is designed by the cartoonist Lisa Hanawalt, who had previously worked with Bob-Waksberg on the webcomic Tip Me Over, Pour Me Out.

== Main characters ==
Actor	Character	Appearances					
Actor	Character	1	2	3	4	5	6
Will Arnett	BoJack Horseman	Main	Main	Main	Main	Main	Main
Amy Sedaris	Princess Carolyn	Main	Main	Main	Main	Main	Main
Alison Brie	Diane Nguyen	Main	Main	Main	Main	Main	Main
Paul F. Tompkins	Mr. Peanutbutter	Main	Main	Main	Main	Main	Main
Aaron Paul	Todd Chavez	Main	Main	Main	Main	Main	Main

=== BoJack Horseman ===
BoJack F. Horseman (voiced by Will Arnett; born January 02, 1964, in San Francisco, California) is a self-loathing, alcoholic, anthropomorphic Thoroughbred horse currently in his 50s. His acting career peaked when he starred in a successful family sitcom called Horsin' Around in the 1990s. He went on to star in The BoJack Horseman Show, an edgier, less successful sitcom which was cancelled in 2007 after just one season. Though he began as a bright-eyed young actor, he has since grown bitter, deeply depressed, and jaded about Hollywood and who he has become post-fame. BoJack has been shown to be caring and insightful, but his insecurities, loneliness, and desperate need for approval often result in self-destructive actions that devastate those around him. Many of his issues stem from his alcoholism, drug abuse, poor career decisions, and trauma from his neglectful and unsupportive parents.

=== Princess Carolyn ===
Princess Carolyn
- First appearance: "BoJack Horseman: The BoJack Horseman Story, Chapter One" (2014)
- Last appearance: "Nice While It Lasted" (2020)
- Created by: Raphael Bob-Waksberg
- Voiced by: Amy Sedaris

In-universe information
- Species: Persian cat
- Occupation: Talent agent (seasons 1–3); Talent manager (seasons 3–6)
- Family: Cutie Cutie Cupcake (mother); Pa Carolyn (father)
- Spouses: Judah Mannowdog (husband)
- Significant others: BoJack Horseman (ex-boyfriend); Rutabaga Rabitowitz (ex-boyfriend); Ralph Stilton (ex-boyfriend); Vincent Adultman (ex-boyfriend)
- Children: Ruthie (adopted daughter)

Princess Carolyn (voiced by Amy Sedaris; born June 6, 1974, in Eden, North Carolina) is a pink Persian cat who is BoJack's agent in the first three seasons and former on-and-off girlfriend. Earnest and unflagging, Princess Carolyn was a top agent at Vigor agency through her dogged pursuit of new talent and large network of odd personal connections. Though she struggles to find a balance between work, her troubled personal life, and taking care of BoJack and her friends, she enjoys her fast-paced hectic lifestyle. She left Vigor to start a new agency with her then-boyfriend and coworker Rutabaga Rabitowitz. After recognizing his lack of trustworthiness and confronting her fear of being alone, she ultimately decides to leave him and run the new company named VIM by herself. After several setbacks, Princess Carolyn closes VIM in season 3, only to reopen it as a management agency. She struggles throughout the series with starting a family, but frequently suffers miscarriages. In season 5, after several failed attempts, she successfully adopts a baby porcupine from Sadie, a young woman from her hometown in North Carolina, who she subsequently names Ruthie in season 6. It is revealed in season 5 that she went to Los Angeles, California because she was accepted into UCLA. In season 6, she rehires her old assistant Judah to help her run VIM and is subsequently offered to run her own female-centered production company from Lenny Turteltaub called Girteltaub. As she prepares to make the transition, Judah confesses his love for her and a year later they are married. She ends the series in a good place and tells BoJack she wishes him well but also that they will not have any future professional relationship.

=== Diane Nguyen ===
Diane Nguyen
- First appearance: "BoJack Horseman: The BoJack Horseman Story, Chapter One" (2014)
- Last appearance: "Nice While It Lasted" (2020)
- Created by: Raphael Bob-Waksberg
- Voiced by: Alison Brie

In-universe information
- Full name: Diane Nguyen
- Species: Human
- Occupation: Writer
- Family: Ma Nguyen (mother); Pa Nguyen (father; deceased); Marty, Artie, Gary, and Tommy Nguyen (brothers)
- Significant others: Mr. Peanutbutter (ex-husband); Guy (husband)

Diane Nguyen (voiced by Alison Brie; born March 19, 1980, in Boston, Massachusetts) is a human ghostwriter; a nice, well-reasoned, misunderstood intellectual; and a Vietnamese-American third-wave feminist from Boston who used to live with her rich and famous ex-boyfriend (and later ex-husband), former sitcom star Mr. Peanutbutter. She is hired by BoJack's publisher to ghostwrite his memoir, having written a biography of BoJack's childhood hero, Secretariat. While writing BoJack's memoir, he and Diane initially develop a strong friendship that becomes increasingly awkward and strained after BoJack develops romantic feelings for her. She has struggled throughout her career to get recognition for her writing, and travels to the war-torn Republic of Cordovia to make a difference, but returns after discovering Sebastian St. Clair, the supposed humanitarian who invited her there to write about his work, is an egomaniac who does not actually care about helping people as much as he cares about his legacy. Ashamed of returning to Mr. Peanutbutter, she enters into a severe depression, during which she drinks heavily, smokes pot, and sleeps disheveled on BoJack's patio furniture. She is able to reconcile her feelings with Mr. Peanutbutter and gets a job at VIM ghostwriting tweets for celebrities. She is subsequently fired from VIM, and is hired to write for a feminist blog. During and after Mr. Peanutbutter's run for Governor of California their marriage begins to deteriorate and, at the beginning of season 5, they divorce. Diane moves into a run-down studio apartment upon separating from Mr. Peanutbutter. In season 6 Diane starts a relationship with her coworker, a Bison named Guy, and decides after returning to her studio apartment to move in with him in Chicago. She begins writing a new memoir that leads her back into her recurring depression. She combats this with antidepressants (which itself leads to a noticeable weight gain) but these stall her progress on her memoir, which she eventually abandons in favor of a teen fiction series called Ivy Tran: Food Court Detective. She eventually moves to Houston with Guy and is revealed in the series finale to have married him. She ends the series having what will seemingly be her last conversation with BoJack, telling him that she is grateful that she knew BoJack and for her life in LA, but that she is ready to move on.

==== Reception ====
Diane has been praised as one of the strongest characters in the series, as it has shown her personal growth in addition to that of BoJack, the lead character. She has also been considered the "voice of reason" in the show, with her story arcs also shedding light on real-world issues. However, the show has also received criticism over its portrayal of Diane and appropriation of Asian American culture, especially in the fact that Alison Brie, a non-Asian actress, voices the Vietnamese-American Diane. Brie has since stated that she regrets voicing the character.

=== Mr. Peanutbutter ===
Mr. Peanutbutter
- First appearance: "BoJack Horseman: The BoJack Horseman Story, Chapter One" (2014)
- Last appearance: "Nice While It Lasted" (2020)
- Created by: Raphael Bob-Waksberg
- Voiced by: Paul F. Tompkins

In-universe information
- Full name: Mr. Peanutbutter
- Species: Labrador Retriever
- Occupation: Actor; Television host
- Family: Captain Peanutbutter (twin brother)
- Significant others: Katrina Peanutbutter (ex-wife); Jessica Biel (ex-wife); Diane Nguyen (ex-wife); Pickles Aplenty (ex-fiancée)

Mr. Peanutbutter (voiced by Paul F. Tompkins; born August 20, 1969) is an energetic and cheerful yellow Labrador Retriever who is BoJack's former sitcom rival and Diane's ex-boyfriend (and later ex-husband). Mr. Peanutbutter was the star of Mr. Peanutbutter's House, which, according to BoJack, "borrowed the premise" from Horsin' Around. He portrays many characteristics of an actual Labrador yet portrayed as a human-like character being sweet, loyal, kind, playful, and considerate. He had a stint at filming a celebrity reality show called Peanutbutter and Jelly. Despite their rivalry, Mr. Peanutbutter cares a great deal about BoJack's opinion and admires him for his work on Horsin' Around. He has an especially good relationship with Todd, and his positive attitude and financial resources combined with Todd's outlandish schemes and plans often result in the two starting questionable business ventures, such as a Halloween store that is exclusively open in January. In the episode "Let's Find Out", Mr. Peanutbutter starts hosting his own televised game show named Hollywoo Stars and Celebrities: What Do They Know? Do They Know Things?? Let's Find Out! after his film company enters bankruptcy due to his and Todd's extensive expenditures on useless products. In "Hank After Dark", it is revealed that Mr. Peanutbutter was formerly married to a woman named Katrina who was emotionally abusive. His second wife was famous actress Jessica Biel, who is portrayed as being obsessed with her celebrity status and people recognizing her. He grew up in the Labrador Peninsula, which is depicted as being populated entirely by Labrador Retrievers. "Mr." is his actual first name. He often shouts to an offscreen, but implicatively outlandish, presence only known as "Erica". He is a graduate of Northwestern University. After his divorce with Diane, he started dating a pug named Pickles who is much younger than him but shares a lot of the same characteristics. At the end of the season 5 finale, he proposes to her, though only out of guilt after cheating on her with Diane. He does eventually tell Pickles of his infidelity which leads to the joint decision that for them to be even she must sleep with other men and him be fine with the situation. He later becomes the face of depression on a tour around the US talking about the mental illness with pop star Joey Pogo. During this time, he encourages Pickles to sleep with Joey Pogo due to their similarities, however this eventually backfires when Pickles leaves Mr. Peanutbutter for Pogo. He ends the series as a star of a widely successful TV show Birthday Dad, and pays to restore the "D" in the Hollywood Sign (however he accidentally orders a "B", renaming it "Hollywoob" as referenced by Princess Carolyn). Mr. Peanutbutter also reveals to BoJack that he is happily single and in therapy working through his addiction to relationships and co-dependency.

=== Todd Chavez ===
Todd Chavez
- First appearance: "BoJack Horseman: The BoJack Horseman Story, Chapter One" (2014)
- Last appearance: "Nice While It Lasted" (2020)
- Created by: Raphael Bob-Waksberg
- Voiced by: Aaron Paul

In-universe information
- Species: Human
- Occupation: Head of Daycare for VIM: Nanny for Princess Carolyn (formerly); President of Ad Sales for WhatTimeIsItRightNow.com (formerly); Prince of Cordovia (briefly); Executive Vice President of West Coast operations of PB Livin (formerly); owner of Cabracadabra (formerly); Governor of California (briefly)
- Family: Jorge Chavez (step-father); Helen Chavez (mother)
- Significant others: Maude (girlfriend); Yolanda Buenaventura (ex-girlfriend); Emily (former love interest)

Todd Chavez (voiced by Aaron Paul; born April 15, 1991) is a friendly and lovable human slacker who ended up at BoJack's house for a party five years before the beginning of the series and never left. Although BoJack constantly voices disdain for him, he secretly cares about Todd, continuing to financially support him and sabotage his attempts to gain independence. Todd has been shown to possess a plethora of skills including an understanding of Japanese; entrepreneurial know-how, having allied with Mr. Peanutbutter for various business ideas; and writing and composing his own rock opera, Newtopia Rising, Book I: The Search for a New Utopia. His rock opera was eventually sabotaged by BoJack, who took advantage of his former addiction to video games. Todd puts the pieces together of what BoJack did string map style and begins to question his friendship with BoJack. Todd also has an uncanny knack for getting himself in absurd and extremely dangerous situations when his friends are not around, such as getting into gun fights on several occasions, ending up in prison, and in one case switching places Prince and the Pauper-style with a dictator from Cordovia, a fictional eastern European country in the midst of a brutal civil war. Todd's friendship with Mr. Peanutbutter landed him various jobs creating seemingly useless products. He sees the best in BoJack, despite his multitude of problems, up until "It's You" in season three, where he finally snaps at him for his constant misdoings; it is not until the season four episode "Hooray! Todd Episode!" where they finally speak again, with the now-humbled BoJack having a sincere talk with him. He is usually happy, even when being insulted by BoJack. His catch phrases include shouting "hooray!". He is also almost never seen without wearing his signature yellow beanie. In the 2000s, he was an aimless skateboarder, and the object of affection of his schoolmate, Emily. It is revealed in the season 3 finale "That Went Well" that he is asexual who is sex-repulsed. In season 5, he gets a management position at a clock website company called "What Time Is It Right Now", but then he gets laid off at the end of season 5. In season 6 episode "The Kidney Stays in the Picture", he gives one of his kidneys to his mom who is in desperate need of one. He later begins a relationship with Maude, an asexual rabbit cashier at an airport Cinnabunny, and they quickly move in together, sharing an affinity for quirky, outlandish ideas. He also reconnects with his mother after several failed attempts catching her attention after staging a fake kidnapping by Character Actress Margo Martindale. At the end of the series, Todd reconnects with BoJack at Princess Carolyn's wedding, revealing that he has made up with his mother and enjoys a comfortable life with Maude and his daycare service which he runs in the VIM Management building. He encourages BoJack to keep up his sobriety and shares an insight about art that leads BoJack to say with affection, "Is that smart or stupid?" and Todd to gleefully say, "I never know!"

== Recurring characters ==
=== Dr. Allen Hu ===
Dr. Allen Hu (voiced by Ken Jeong) is a human pediatric physician/surgeon who frequently sells drugs to Sarah Lynn. Dr. Hu is also seen abusing personally-prescribed narcotics. An unseen character throughout most of the first season, he is the subject of a recurring joke based on the phonetic similarity of his name to "who" with BoJack and others believing that Sarah's drug connection is a man who simply calls himself "Doctor Who" rather than an actual physician. He made his first onscreen appearance in the season one episode "Downer Ending." Hu is brought back in the season five episode "Ancient History" where he has since attended drug rehab to clean himself up following the overdose death of Sarah Lynn and will no longer prescribe pills indiscriminately.

=== Ana Spanakopita ===
Ana Spanakopita (voiced by Angela Bassett) is a human Hollywoo publicist who specializes in getting celebrities Oscars, hence her title "The Oscar Whisperer". She spends much of season three trying to help BoJack's image, which leads to a relationship with him. Ana breaks up with him after he fails to get the Oscar nomination. She returns in season 5 as the publicist for embattled Hollywoo celebrity Vance Waggoner. She eventually drops him after being disillusioned by him, and sends Diane a recording she has of BoJack admitting to his actions in New Mexico, which causes Diane and BoJack's relationship to deteriorate.

=== Beatrice Horseman ===
Beatrice Elizabeth Horseman (née Sugarman) (voiced by Wendie Malick); was a horse who was BoJack's neglectful, verbally abusive mother. Heiress to the Sugarman sugar cube fortune, she primarily appears in flashbacks of BoJack's childhood and young adult life. In "Brand New Couch", Beatrice calls up BoJack to tell him she read the book about him and concedes that he was born "broken". In "The Old Sugarman Place", it is revealed that Beatrice's family had a summer home in Michigan when she was a child, and that she had an older brother named Crackerjack, who died in World War II, which led to her mother being lobotomized as treatment for her grief. Her childhood was marked by cruel treatment from her misogynistic father and school bullies, hardening and embittering her personality. While seen as a liberal, Barnard-educated college graduate concerned with the civil rights movement, she soon becomes bitter and jaded after making the poor choice to romantically involve herself with Butterscotch Horseman, whom she meets and has a one-night stand with after he crashes her debutante ball. After becoming impregnated by Butterscotch, Beatrice decides to marry him and move to San Francisco, California, where their marriage quickly crumbles and she becomes jaded, bitter, and openly resentful of BoJack, blaming him for her dissatisfaction in her life and ruining her beauty and figure. She begins to suffer from dementia and after an incident at her nursing home, she moves in with BoJack and Hollyhock. However, after BoJack realizes Beatrice has been drugging Hollyhock to the point of overdose (to make her lose weight), BoJack kicks her out of his house to put her into an even worse nursing home and makes clear he no longer wants her in his life, although after she finally recognizes him, he lies and says she’s with her family at their summer home in Michigan. In the episode "Free Churro", it is revealed that Beatrice has died at the age of 80 years old, as BoJack is delivering a eulogy to her throughout the episode. She makes a final appearance as a part of BoJack's hallucination in the episode "The View from Halfway Down", as one of the several deceased people from BoJack's past whom he sees after he almost died by suicide.

=== Bradley Hitler-Smith ===
Bradley Hitler-Smith (voiced by Adam Conover) – A human actor who played the Horse's adopted son Ethan on Horsin' Around. A running joke in Horsin' Around was that he had a catchphrase ("Yowsa-Yowsa Bo-Bowsa") to which the studio audience responded with an awkward silence. In "Still Broken", it is revealed that Bradley is living in Olympia, Washington, and that his parents divorced after BoJack had an affair with Bradley's mother. In season three, Bradley comes to BoJack with a sequel series idea Ethan Around which he initially turns down though later comes back when he decides to make amends with Bradley. However, BoJack experiences anxiety when his child co-star mentions wanting to be "like him", and he leaves Bradley on the set before the episode can be finished.

=== Butterscotch Horseman ===
Butterscotch Horseman (voiced by Will Arnett) was a horse who was BoJack's physically and verbally abusive father (Beatrice even implies to Bojack that he beats her). He appears in flashbacks to BoJack's childhood. Butterscotch, who hailed from a working-class background, was an alcoholic and failed novelist. He resented his wife's financial independence and took out his insecurities on BoJack (and to a lesser extent Beatrice). In flashbacks, Butterscotch is often seen yelling nonsensical conservative hyperbole such as claiming that the Panama Canal is for "Democrats", claiming that imaginary friends are "freeloaders invented by Communists", and calling screws "fancy Jew nails." He died from blunt force trauma after hitting a rock in the midst of a duel in 2009. In "Time's Arrow", it is revealed that Butterscotch is Hollyhock's father, due to his affair with the family maid named Henrietta. In "Free Churro", BoJack revealed that Butterscotch died after challenging a man who hated his book to a duel and then tripping and hitting his head on a rock as he turned around to ask the man if he actually read the book. However, it's left ambiguous if whether or not the one who he challenged actually read his book.

A version of Butterscotch appears in the penultimate episode "The View From Halfway Down" as one of many deceased people from BoJack's past whom he sees in a prolonged hallucination while he is unconscious following a suicide attempt. While most of the other figures in the hallucination appear as they did in life, Butterscotch is portrayed as a hybrid with Secretariat, with Secretariat's appearance and Butterscotch's voice, and his personality/experiences being presented as a combination of the two. During the hallucination, the half of the horse that is based on Butterscotch tells BoJack that he always cared about and loved him, but was terrified of letting that show. In the cabaret, he performs a reading of the eponymous poem "The View From Halfway Down," drawing from Butterscotch's penchant for literature and poetry while being largely based on Secretariat's suicide.

=== Dr. Champ ===
Dr. Champ (season 6, voiced by Sam Richardson) is a therapy horse working at Pastiches Malibu Rehabilitation Center, and himself a former alcoholic. Similar to Mr. Peanutbutter, "Dr." is his first name, implying he is not actually a licensed doctor. He frequently tries to get BoJack to open up about his inner demons, but BoJack constantly deflects his questions with jokes. After six months, Dr. Champ urges BoJack to leave rehab, only for BoJack to stay and take care of him when he relapses into alcoholism (caused by a comedic mishap when he unwittingly drinks Bojack's water bottle containing vodka). BoJack checks Dr. Champ into a different rehab center, and Dr. Champ angrily blames BoJack for causing him to relapse (albeit accidentally) and ending his therapy career. He is later seen drunkenly talking to Paige Sinclair and Biscuits Braxby, spilling details of BoJack's time in therapy, taking advantage of the fact that, being a therapy horse and not an actual psychotherapist, he is not bound by confidentiality.

=== Charley Witherspoon ===
Charley Witherspoon (voiced by Raphael Bob-Waksberg) is a tree frog who is the son of Mr. Witherspoon. He works at the Vigor agency where his hand keeps sticking to things. Charley was briefly Princess Carolyn's assistant, but was later made an agent.

After his father's death, he is sworn in as the new President of Vigor. He is shown to be a poor leader, choosing to hire the Utah Jazz as agents rather than basketball players. He offered to buy VIM from Princess Carolyn, however her assistant Judah kept this information from her in order to protect her ego.

=== Charlotte Carson ===
Charlotte Carson (née Moore) (voiced by Olivia Wilde; born c. 1967) is a red deer who was Herb Kazzaz's old girlfriend with whom BoJack was once in love. During a drug and alcohol induced stupor in "Downer Ending", BoJack imagines an alternate life where instead of becoming a television star he moves to the countryside in Maine with Charlotte. In this fantasy, the couple get married, have a daughter named Harper, and lead a quiet rustic lifestyle.

In "Still Broken", Charlotte attended Herb Kazzaz's funeral. In a discussion with BoJack, she mentioned that she visited Herb and read the part in BoJack's book on how he and Herb fought over a telescope. She tells him she only lived in Maine for a month and later moved to Tesuque, New Mexico. Before she departs the funeral she hands Bojack her business card. In "Escape from LA", BoJack drives to Charlotte's business "Your Deer Friend" which sells turquoise paraphernalia, then she takes him to her house to find she is happily married to a loving, dorky, dad-joke making man named Kyle (Ed Helms) and has two teenage children named Trip (a human voiced by Adam Pally) and Penny (a doe). During his time in New Mexico, BoJack bonds with the 17-year-old Penny by becoming her "date" for prom. While talking with Charlotte later over by her fire pit in her background, the two share a brief kiss. BoJack initially urges her to leave with him anew amidst her protests, eventually relenting. However, Charlotte asks him to leave by the next day, confessing his presence depresses her. Later that night, Charlotte catches BoJack and Penny in a compromising position inside his yacht. BoJack tries to apologize but sternly orders him to leave immediately and never have contact with her or her family again.

Charlotte returns briefly in the final season, when she and Penny are approached by reporter Paige Sinclair who seeks details of their encounter with BoJack for an article she is writing about his involvement in Sarah Lynn's death. She tells BoJack she does not want herself or Penny to be involved and that he has to handle the situation, causing BoJack to hyperventilate and later pass out at his place of employment.

=== Corduroy Jackson-Jackson ===
Corduroy Jackson-Jackson (voiced by Brandon T. Jackson) is BoJack's human co-star in the Secretariat movie. He dies from auto-erotic asphyxiation. The movie is later dedicated in memory of him.

Jackson-Jackson later appears in the series' penultimate episode as a part of BoJack's hallucination during his near-death experience.

=== Courtney Portnoy ===
Courtney Portnoy (voiced by Sharon Horgan) is a human tongue-twisting celebrity actress and one of Princess Carolyn's managerial clients, though she is also represented by Rutabaga Rabitowitz. She gets set up in a fake romantic relationship with Todd in order to improve her public appearance. She is shown to be highly superficial and materialistic. She starred in the movie Ms. Taken, an inter-universe spin-off of the Liam Neeson Taken movie series, but the film was abandoned by the studio following a series of highly publicized mass shooting incidents. After a series of mishaps with her career including Todd calling off the fake engagement and Ms. Taken getting pulled, she fires Princess Carolyn. It is revealed in a sight gag in the series finale that she is cast in Kelsey Jannings' superhero film Fireflame alongside Gina Cazador.

=== Crackerjack Sugarman ===
Crackerjack Sugarman (voiced by Lin-Manuel Miranda) – Beatrice Horseman's older brother, BoJack's uncle, and the eldest son of Joseph and Honey Sugarman, who died in World War II when Beatrice was very young. He died in December 1944. He later appears at the end of the series as one of the many deceased people BoJack sees in his hallucination with whom he ecstatically meets while in his hallucination following his near-death experience. During the theatrical show scene in BoJack's hallucination, he plays the trumpet for Beatrice while she does an acrobatic routine.

=== Emily ===
Emily (voiced by Abbi Jacobson) is the love interest of Todd whom she has known since high school. She is shown to have romantic feelings for Todd, and chooses to sleep with BoJack following Todd's initial "rejection" before she learns he is asexual. Emily is one of the co-founders of "Cabracadabra" with Todd and Mr. Peanutbutter, and becomes a millionaire following its sale. In later episodes, she founds a dating app for firefighters to meet her, and another dating app for asexuals called All About that Ace.

Near the end of season 5, Todd builds the sex robot Henry Fondle for her so that they can become a couple, but she declines.

=== Flip McVicker ===
Flip McVicker (voiced by Rami Malek) is the human showrunner of BoJack's new TV show, Philbert. Though he believes himself to be a genius, he is actually deeply insecure, lacks creative writing skills, and is manipulative clashing with BoJack and other cast members throughout the filming of Philbert.

=== Gina Cazador ===
Gina Cazador (voiced by Stephanie Beatriz) is BoJack's human co-star on Philbert. They begin a sexual relationship off-set that later evolves into dating, until she breaks up with BoJack when his drug addiction spirals out of control. BoJack then chokes Gina on set while they were filming an episode of Philbert while he was high on painkillers and then does an interview (before the interview, Gina tells BoJack while she'll continue to work with him, she never wants to speak to him again.) to hide the fact that BoJack was really choking her by stating it was all just an act and that they've broken up because of what BoJack did (even having to kiss BoJack to make her statements sound sincere, much to her dismay). Gina has spent most of her career doing small parts and sees Philbert as her chance to finally break out. By season 6, her acting career has taken off, however her experience with BoJack has changed her and caused her to be incredibly anxious on set, especially when doing stunts. This garners her a reputation throughout Hollywoo for being difficult to work with, which seems to cost her a high-profile role in Kelsey Jannings' superhero film Fireflame (it is revealed in the series finale, however, that she does in fact get the role and stars alongside Courtney Portnoy, who is also considered for the role).

=== Guy ===
Guy (voiced by LaKeith Stanfield) is a bison that works as a cameraman for Girl Croosh. He travels with Diane throughout the country filming exposés, and the two soon begin dating. He asks Diane to stay with him at his home in Chicago; and though Diane initially declines, she later changes her mind and moves in with him. He remains supportive of Diane and her attempt to write her own book of essays. He also has a teenage son, Sonny, from a previous marriage to a woman named Lady. When Lady moves to Houston and takes Sonny with her, Guy moves to Houston to stay near his son, with Diane promising to go with him. In the series finale, Diane tells BoJack that she initially stayed in Chicago to pursue a long-distance relationship out of fear following BoJack's suicide attempt, but that she nevertheless came to her senses, moved to Houston, and married Guy.

=== Hank Hippopopalous ===
Hank Hippopopalous (voiced by Philip Baker Hall) – A hippopotamus who is a beloved former host of a late-night talk show called Hank After Dark. At the 1994 Animals' Choice Awards, he won the award for Male Animal in a Comedy, Drama or Variety Show, for which BoJack Horseman and Mr. Peanutbutter were also nominated and was given the award by Scott Wolf and Matthew Fox. Mr. Peanutbutter idolizes him and treasures having met him at the awards after-party. He is the host of a TV dance competition Hey, I Think You Can Dance. Hippopopalous is known in the TV industry as Uncle Hankie.

In the episode "Hank After Dark", Diane inadvertently causes a controversy by including the beloved entertainer in a mention of celebrities who have done worse things than BoJack. The controversy involved unspecified allegations made against him by all eight of his female former assistants.

=== Henry Fondle ===
Henry Fondle (voiced by Aaron Paul) is a sex robot designed by Todd in an attempt to get Emily to date him again without having sex with her. His incredibly lewd voice prompts are misunderstood by everyone as normal conversation, which leads to his becoming CEO of WhatTimeIsItRightNow.com. After a nonsexual "low battery" prompt is misconstrued as sexual harassment, Henry is fired from his position. After seeing Henry receive a job offer to be CEO of a different company immediately after the scandal, Todd puts down Henry with a taser.

=== Herb Kazzaz ===
Herb Kazzaz (1961–2015; voiced by Stanley Tucci) was BoJack's human comedy partner, who created and wrote Horsin' Around where he also provided the voice of Mr. Libertore who runs the law firm where the Horse works as an attorney. Herb appeared to be friendly and upbeat during the show's production, usually nice, understanding, and insightful to all his cast. When BoJack and Herb first meet as comedians, BoJack angrily tells him to "get cancer" which is what eventually happens. Halfway through production of Horsin' Around, Herb is caught engaging in a public sexual act with another man which causes a public outcry (over Herb being gay) for his removal from the show. BoJack and Herb had a falling out at the apex of the show's success when Herb was blackballed by the network for being gay and BoJack did not stand up for Herb out of fear he'll losing his own job (though in season 6 it's revealed the network executive Angela wasn't actually going to fire Herb or Bojack). At the beginning of the series, they have not spoken for nearly 20 years. BoJack attempts to reconnect with him after learning from Sarah Lynn Herb has been diagnosed with terminal rectal cancer and is being watched over by his nurse Tina. Though Herb reveals he lived a full and good life in spite of losing Horsin' Around, he has not forgiven BoJack for not having been a supportive friend and refuses to do so when BoJack finally apologizes to him, then prompting Herb to demand Bojack leave his house immediately. On the way out of Herb's house Bojack notices a telescope from when he and Herb worked on Horsin' Around on one of his shelves and picks it. Herb orders him to put the telescope back to Bojack's changrin and they 'fight' each other over it before Tina and Diane break up the 'scuffle' between the duo. Herb harshly tells Bojack "you're a selfish goddamn coward who takes whatever he wants and doesn't give a shit about who he hurts. That's you! That's Bojack Horseman!"

Despite his cancer going into remission, he instantly passes away due to an allergic reaction to the peanuts on a peanut truck in a car crash when his brakes gave out during a ride home from the hospital. It was also revealed that Herb's office was under the room where tap dancer Savion Glover kept a studio. Following his death, Henry Winkler (who Herb met volunteering at Habitat for Humanity) and Tina stole the manuscript of his poorly written novel to keep it from being published and tainting his legacy. In "Out to Sea", Herb's ashes are donated to the Jerb Kazzaz Memorial Orphanage (misspelled due to BoJack's email and the hedgehog owner's stubborn refusal to pay for its replacement). He makes a final appearance as a part of BoJack's hallucination in the episode "The View from Halfway Down", as one of the several deceased people from BoJack's past whom he sees after he almost committed suicide.

=== Hollyhock ===
Hollyhock Manheim-Mannheim-Guerrero-Robinson-Zilberschlag-Hsung-Fonzarelli-McQuack (voiced by Aparna Nancherla; born September 24, 2000) is a 17-year-old filly first seen at the end of "That Went Well". She was adopted by eight fathers in a committed gay polyamorous relationship. She is at first believed to be BoJack's illegitimate daughter. During season four, she moves in with BoJack to find out more about him and later visits Beatrice, BoJack's mother, who also moves in with them. It is later revealed that she is actually the illegitimate daughter of Butterscotch Horseman, BoJack's father, and Beatrice's maid, Henrietta, making her BoJack's half-sister. Beatrice, who snipes at Hollyhock for being overweight, spikes her coffee with weight-loss supplements (containing amphetamines). She overdoses and is rushed to the hospital and survives, although she suffers from PTSD-like symptoms when she returns to BoJack's house. In season 5, she is a freshman at Wesleyan University. In the season 6 mid-season cliff hanger, "A Quick One While He is Away", she goes to a party in NYC and meets Pete-Repeat, who tells her of the time BoJack gave Pete's then-girlfriend alcohol poisoning after a high school prom and covered it up. When BoJack takes a teaching position at Wesleyan, Hollyhock is distant from him due to learning about that past misdeed and makes it clear she does not appreciate him imposing himself on her college experience, stating that he should not say she is his sister "like it means something" and only reluctantly giving him any reason to think they will have an improved relationship going forward. When the full weight of BoJack's misdeeds becomes public, Hollyhock ignores BoJack's desperate phone messages, disconnects her phone, and sends him a letter which is unseen; however, his heartbroken reaction to it implies she no longer wishes to have any contact or relationship with him.

=== Honey Sugarman ===
Honey Sugarman (voiced by Jane Krakowski) was Beatrice's mother and BoJack's maternal grandmother. She was a housewife and exceptional singer, but suffered from post-traumatic stress disorder after her son, Crackerjack Sugarman, was killed in World War II. After she got drunk and made a scene while out with young Beatrice and forced her to drive home, and the resultant car accident, her husband had her lobotomized.

=== Joey Pogo ===
Joey Pogo (voiced by Hilary Swank) is a human pop star who is initially introduced when he is set to replace BoJack in the "fancy room" at Pastiches Rehab, but he checks out almost immediately. He later joins Mr. Peanutbutter touring across the country giving talks about mental illness and depression. He and Mr. Peanutbutter become very close friends due to their similar characteristics and the two of them and Pickles invest in the Elefino restaurant together. Mr. Peanutbutter volunteers Joey to sleep with Pickles so that she can get back at him for cheating on her with Diane, but it backfires on Mr. Peanutbutter when Pickles and Joey catch feelings for one another. Pickles then joins Joey on tour as his social media manager and eventually leaves Mr. Peanutbutter for Joey.

=== Jogging Baboon ===
The Jogging Baboon (voiced by Jason Beghe) is an unnamed Hamadryas baboon that is often seen jogging by BoJack Horseman's house. In "Out to Sea", the Jogging Baboon comes across BoJack jogging. He tells BoJack that jogging may be hard at first, but it will get easier if he does it every day.

=== Joseph Sugarman ===
Joseph Sugarman (voiced by Matthew Broderick) was Beatrice's father and BoJack's maternal grandfather, the owner of the Sugarman Sugar corporation. Emotionally distant, he frequently spouted his backward views about women, making Beatrice feel insecure and inadequate (for which she compensates with cruelty as an adult).

=== Judah ===
Judah Mannowdog (voiced by Diedrich Bader) is a human part-owner for Princess Carolyn's agency VIM. He is depicted as comically deadpan and does not seem to really understand humor or sarcasm. Though he remains unflinchingly loyal to Princess Carolyn even after VIM collapses, he is fired by Princess Carolyn after she finds out about him going behind her back and talking with Charley Witherspoon about a potential merger with Vigor, which he turned down and never brought up to her.

However, in season 6, when all the assistants in Hollywoo go on strike, he is brought in to handle negotiations for them and subsequently rehired at VIM. Near the end of the series he professes his love for Princess Carolyn and in the series finale, the two of them are married. He is known for his heavy facial hair and long hair, which is frequently made fun of by guests at VIM. His name is a play on You're The Man Now Dog, the name of an online community centered on the creation of hosted memetic web pages, with the name taken from a Sean Connery line in the film Finding Forrester.

=== Katrina ===
Katrina (voiced by Lake Bell) is Mr. Peanutbutter's emotionally abusive human ex-wife, an abrasive, hard-driving political operative. (Diane appropriately nicknames her "Cruella.") She first appears in a flashback at the beginning of "Hank After Dark.' It is implied that she introduced Mr. Peanutbutter to the off-screen presence known as "Erica". At the end of season three, she contacts Mr. Peanutbutter about running for Governor of California. She becomes campaign manager for Mr. Peanutbutter, but after Mr. Peanutbutter drops out, she gets back at him by acting as Jessica Biel's campaign manager. Starting with season four, she takes Sarah Lynn's place during the party sequence in the opening credits.

=== Kelsey Jannings ===
Kelsey Jannings (voiced by Maria Bamford) is a human woman that was hired to direct the Secretariat movie. A divorced, lesbian, independent filmmaker, she sees the Secretariat project as her last chance to break into the big time and make enough money to get her daughter Irving into an Ivy League school (as opposed to Vassar). Cynical and initially dismissive of BoJack's attitude, she and BoJack grow closer over the course of filming. She has a special fondness for Todd because she likes his face. She is later fired by Lenny Turteltaub in "The Shot" for filming a scene that involved Secretariat's encounter with Richard Nixon which had since been cut from the film.

In season three, BoJack finds Kelsey at POFF (Pacific Ocean Film Festival) and attempts to reconcile with her through various apology notes, but she cannot understand it because the ink washes away. Later in the season, the two discuss doing a serious independent film together called Jelly Belle to legitimize BoJack as an actor. Unfortunately, this is part of a plan by Vanessa Gekko to sabotage Princess Carolyn's agency, and the film option expires before a deal can be reached. The resulting fallout seemingly ends BoJack's unique professional and artistic connection with Kelsey.

In season six, Kelsey is struggling to find directing jobs, due in part to her getting fired from the Secretariat film. After giving an impassioned speech about the hurdles she has had to face due to sexism in the film industry, she gets the job directing the female superhero film Fireflame.

=== Lenny Turteltaub ===
Lenny Turteltaub (voiced by J.K. Simmons) is a turtle and big-shot film producer in Hollywoo. He worked with Ed Begley, Sr., Lionel Barrymore, Buster Keaton and Edwin S. Porter during their youth, suggesting that he is extremely old (a reference to the lifespan of actual turtles). He is shown to dislike BoJack, but continuously casts him in projects for financial gain. His name is a play off Hollywood producer and director Jon Turteltaub.

=== Maude ===
Maude (voiced by Echo Gillette) is a counter girl rabbit working for Cinnabunny at Air Bud International Airport. When she breaks up with her boyfriend, alluding to it being a lack of sexual interest, BoJack recommends Todd's asexual dating app. Afterward, she and Todd become boyfriend and girlfriend. They move in together after Todd moves out of Princess Carolyn's house and Maude stops living with her parents. As of the series finale, Todd and Maude are still in a good relationship.

=== Officer Meow Meow Fuzzyface ===
Officer Meow Meow Fuzzyface (voiced by Cedric Yarbrough) is a Snowshoe cat who works as a police officer at the Los Angeles Police Department's 12th Precinct. He takes his duties very seriously, although there is intense disagreement within the police force over whether he is a "reckless renegade", a "loose cannon", or just a "cop on the edge with nothing to lose."

=== Paige Sinclair ===
Paige Sinclair (voiced by Paget Brewster) is a warthog reporter at the Hollywoo Reporter who investigates Sarah Lynn's death alongside Maximilian Banks. She and Maximillian act as if they are in a 1930s screwball comedy. She publishes an article exposing BoJack's role in Sarah Lynn's death and later gathers more detail to orchestrate a hard-hitting interview with BoJack by Biscuits Braxby, both of which directly lead to BoJack's downfall.

=== Paparazzi Birds ===
The Paparazzi Birds (voiced by Adam Conover and Dave Segal) are a blue jay and robin duo who try to get incriminating pictures of BoJack, Diane, and other celebrities. They attempt to blackmail BoJack after taking photos of him having intercourse with Sarah Lynn, but are stopped by Vanessa Gekko under threat of a lawsuit for trespassing, paparazzing without a permit, and blackmail before threatening to frame them for Tupac's murder.

=== Penny Carson ===
Penny Carson (voiced by Ilana Glazer; born c. 1997) is a teenage red deer who is Charlotte and Kyle's daughter, and Trip's sister. She bonds with BoJack while he stays at their home during "Escape from L.A." where he acts as her surrogate date for her prom. After returning from their prom excursion, she propositions him to have sex which BoJack rejects despite her saying she is of consent age in her state (New Mexico). Charlotte later finds her and BoJack in a compromising position on his yacht and she is sent to her room before either she can explain or he can apologize for what gonna happen.

In season three, BoJack attempts to reconcile with Penny believing she may have been emotionally damaged because of the incident and finds her at her school Oberlin College. Penny freaks out when he suddenly appears and runs off stating that he should not be here.

She appears again in season 6 when Paige and Maximilian ask for details about her encounter with BoJack. She considers if it is time to finally come forward, with Charlotte telling her that if she does, she must do it on her own terms.

=== Pickles Aplenty ===
Pickles Aplenty (voiced by Hong Chau in season 5, Julia Chan in season 6) (born 1993) is a pug waitress, and aspiring social media influencer, who works at BoJack's restaurant, and becomes Mr. Peanutbutter's girlfriend in season 5. She is much younger than Mr. Peanutbutter and is anxious about his past marriages. While they were dating in season 5, he proposes to her, wanting to make her his fourth wife, albeit, the proposal was out of guilt from him cheating on her with Diane. In season 6, Mr. Peanutbutter confesses to cheating on Pickles and suggests that she sleep with another man to get even with him, eventually suggesting his friend and international pop star Joey Pogo. This backfires for Mr. Peanutbutter when Pickles and Pogo develop feelings for one another after having sex, and Pickles decides to follow Pogo on tour to be his social media manager, initially maintaining a long-distance relationship with Mr. Peanutbutter. Eventually, however, she leaves him for Joey Pogo.

=== Pinky Penguin ===
Pinky Penguin (voiced by Patton Oswalt) is an Emperor penguin and book editor who works at Penguin Publishing. He was depending on BoJack's book to save his job and the entire company. In "Yesterdayland", Pinky started working at MBN. At the end of "Later", it is revealed he was able to see his kids again. After Wanda moves to Detroit, he becomes the head of MBN. His wife has stated that everything he touches falls apart, and much of his character's humor is derived from his failures or near-failures.

=== Sarah Lynn ===
Sarah Lynn (born Sarah Himmelfarb, voiced by Kristen Schaal; 1984–2016) was a human actress who played the Horse's precocious adoptive youngest daughter Sabrina on Horsin' Around starting when she was only three years old, and who looked up to BoJack off-screen as a father figure. After the show went off the air, she became a successful pop singer in the early 2000s before drug addiction and alcoholism ended her career. Flashbacks indicate that Sarah Lynn's self-destructive behavior is in part the result of being forced into an acting career by her mother, and BoJack (whom she idolized) having neglected her as a child. Around the end of "Later", she was seen visiting Andrew Garfield (with whom she was mentioned as having an on-again, off-again relationship) at the hospital. It is heavily implied that she was sexually abused as a child by her mother's boyfriend and later stepfather, making her know what "bear fur tastes like". Although BoJack attempts to get her sober earlier in season 1, he later goes on a bender with her and Todd in an attempt to rewrite his memoir after firing Diane.

In season 3, she becomes sober, but only because she hears that taking drugs after being sober for a long time is the best experience. When BoJack hits rock bottom, he invites Sarah Lynn to go on an epic bender. Through a series of blackouts, they have a series of misadventures attempting to make amends to BoJack's ex-friends, and even stalking Penny at Oberlin College. Along the way, Sarah Lynn wins the Academy Award for Best Original Song in absentia. She then admits to BoJack that she does not like anything about herself and, at the Griffith Observatory planetarium, dies after a drug overdose. While the initial footage makes it appear that Sarah Lynn died while resting her head on BoJack's shoulder and he found out she had died when he woke up after passing out from his own narcotic bender, it's later revealed that she was in fact unconscious and a panicked BoJack ran away from her and waited 17 minutes until he could get away from the area and call 911—she may have lived if he'd called for help immediately, but he was terrified of being identified as the person who joined a beloved young entertainer in a massive addictive spree that killed her. In "That Went Well", it is revealed that BoJack was at one point her only friend who hadn't tried to get something from her, and her downward spiral began after he visited her and tried to get her to be a guest star on his TV show, leaving Sarah Lynn quietly devastated that even he valued her for her fame and power. It is later revealed in "A Little Uneven, Is All" that the first time Sarah Lynn drank alcohol was from a bottle of vodka that BoJack left on set when she was ten years old. During season 6, BoJack has recurring flashbacks about her and is one of the reasons why he wants to get sober. She makes a final appearance as a part of BoJack's hallucination in the episode "The View from Halfway Down", as one of the several deceased people from BoJack's past whom he sees after he almost drowns.

=== Ralph Stilton ===
Ralph Stilton (voiced by Raúl Esparza) is a mouse who is Princess Carolyn's new love interest at the end of season 3. He and Princess Carolyn were set up on a blind date unaware of the other's species. He runs a greeting card company and is an heir to the Stilton hotel's fortune.

In season 4, he attempts to start a family with Princess Carolyn and attempts to find ways to impregnate her. Princess Carolyn dumps him in "Ruthie" after she gives him an ultimatum to stand behind her continuous tries for a baby in spite of multiple miscarriages, and he despondently leaves her apartment.

They reconnect in season 5, where he attempts to persuade Princess Carolyn to adopt a child with him. His name is a reference to Ralph S. Mouse and Geronimo Stilton.

=== Roxy ===
Roxy (voiced by Fielding Edlow) is Diane's human friend. She was initially introduced as her and Mr. Peanutbutter's wedding officiant in "Horse Majure". She worked alongside Diane and Wayne as both a barista and a cater waiter. She is baffled by Diane's relationship and possible obsession with BoJack since she came to him after abandoning Cordovia, and not to her or any of her other friends.

=== Rutabaga Rabitowitz ===
Rutabaga Rabitowitz (voiced by Ben Schwartz) is a harlequin rabbit agent at the Vigor agency who works one floor below Princess Carolyn. He later informed her of J.D. Salinger still being alive. Rutabaga cheats on his wife Katie with Princess Carolyn, claiming he plans to obtain a divorce. He later persuades Princess Carolyn to join him in founding their own agency upon seceding from Vigor. After revealing his reluctance to divorce yet wishing to continue the affair, Princess Carolyn abandons him.

He later makes his own agency with Vanessa Gekko called Gekko-Rabitowitz. Later on, Rutabaga has rekindled his marriage to Katie who gives birth to septuplets on New Year's Eve.

=== Sebastian St Clair ===
Sebastian St Clair (voiced by Keegan-Michael Key) – A snow leopard billionaire bachelor philanthropist who wants Diane to accompany him to a third world country, Cordovia, to ghostwrite a novel about his work rebuilding the community and caring for the citizens. Though Diane initially looks up to him because he wants to change the world in a positive way, she quickly becomes disillusioned when it becomes clear he is more concerned with making a legacy for himself than with actually helping people.

=== Sextina Aquafina ===
Sextina Aquafina (voiced by Aisha Tyler in seasons 1–2, Daniele Gaither in season 3, born c. 2000) is a bottlenose dolphin pop-music sensation. In "Out to Sea", Diane meets with Sextina to discuss becoming her social-media ghostwriter. In the season three episode "Brrap Brrap Pew Pew", Diane accidentally tweeted out that Sextina was having an abortion while she was being distracted, which caused a media storm. While Sextina was initially angered with the tweet and tried to fire Diane, she later embraced the image because of support from other celebrities. She later released a music video militantly supporting abortion, had her "abortion" on live TV, and soon after became pregnant. It is implied that she is sent to a farm where celebrities go to disappear.

According to creator Raphael Bob-Waksberg, she is based on a girl who was in his and Lisa Hanawalt's English class as a senior in high school.

=== Sharona ===
Sharona (voiced by Amy Sedaris) was the hair and make-up girl for Horsin' Around. She takes the fall for Sarah Lynn's accidental drinking of alcohol. She reunites with BoJack in season 6 at an AA meeting, and they reconcile over the incident after BoJack apologizes. She then cuts his hair and convinces him to stop dyeing it, revealing his natural grey locks.

=== Stefani Stilton ===
Stefani Stilton (voiced by Kimiko Glenn) is Ralph Stilton's sister, also a mouse. She hires Diane at the end of season 3 to write for her new feminist viral blog "Girl Croosh".

During season 6, she sells Girl Croosh to Whitewhale Enterprises.

=== A Ryan Seacrest Type ===
A Ryan Seacrest Type (voiced by Adam Conover) is the name of a human character who hosts "Excess Hollywood" (later renamed "Excess Hollywoo" after BoJack steals the D in the Hollywood Sign and the D is accidentally destroyed in a helicopter crash) and interviews celebrities. He also hosts "Morning Time, Hollywoo" with a female human called Some Lady, and briefly with another co-host named An Actress or Something who is filling in for Some Lady after her apparent kidnapping. In the third season, he is run over by BoJack driving a limo. He is later revealed to have somehow survived and hosts a late night talk show as well as co-hosting Excess Hollywoo with "A Billy Bush Type" (voiced by Kevin Bigley). He briefly co-anchors the ski race between Mr. Peanutbutter and Woodchuck Coodchuck-Berkowitz with Tom Jumbo-Grumbo, but quits after being sensitive to the cold weather.

In season 5, it is revealed that he also hosts a radio show called The Deep Dive.

=== Tina ===
Tina (vocal effects provided by Raphael Bob-Waksberg) is a grizzly bear who is the nurse of Herb Kazzaz. In "Still Broken", Tina was in collaboration with Henry Winkler to keep Herb's terrible manuscript for a novel from being posthumously published and harming his legacy. Unlike the other anthropomorphic characters on the show, Tina only speaks in growls.

Later in season 4, Tina returns as the nurse of BoJack's mother Beatrice.

=== Tom Jumbo-Grumbo ===
Tom Jumbo-Grumbo (voiced by Keith Olbermann) is a blue whale who is a newsman and pundit on MSNBSea (a parody of MSNBC). Tom often reports on BoJack's misdeeds and other happenings in Hollywoo, often through alliteration. Whenever something goes wrong on the air, he blames it all on an off-screen presence only known as "Randy", and makes various jokes at the expense of his squid ex-wife Shannon, though he usually immediately apologizes afterwards.

=== Tracy ===
Tracy (voiced by Jean Villepique) is a human case worker assigned to handle Princess Carolyn's adoption. She is very likely the long-lost twin sister of Princess Carolyn's assistant, Stewart.

=== Vance Waggoner ===
Vance Waggoner (voiced by Bobby Cannavale) is a human Hollywoo actor with a history of assault and making sexist, racist, and anti-semitic comments, who nevertheless is always able to revive his career by publicly apologizing (albeit insincerely) for his actions. He is initially cast on Philbert as Philbert's partner Fritz, due to Waggoner's "bad boy" reputation, but the controversy that ensues as a result of Waggoner's past and with Philbert's indelicate subject matter (as well as the countless job offers that he receives after returning to the spotlight) causes him to leave the show and be recast with Mr. Peanutbutter.

He appears later in season 6 to be BoJack's AA sponsor after no one is willing to work or talk with BoJack anymore due to Bojack being canceled for how he indirectly killed Sarah Lynn, and the two bond over having been "canceled." Waggoner encourages BoJack to hold onto his anger and continue making content for the small part of the population that still supports him, and directs BoJack in The Horny Unicorn, a bawdy, low-brow comedy.

=== Vanessa Gekko ===
Vanessa Gekko (voiced by Kristin Chenoweth) – A human Hollywoo talent agent and the rival of Princess Carolyn. She is a seemingly better agent than Princess Carolyn because she has a husband and kids, thereby "having it all." She temporarily shares an office with Princess Carolyn when their agencies merge.

Sometime between seasons 2 and 3, she and Rutabaga started their own agency, Gekko-Rabitowitz, which ultimately sabotages VIM, leading to the latter agency's collapse.

=== Vincent Adultman ===
Vincent Adultman (voiced by Alison Brie) is Princess Carolyn's boyfriend for a brief period of time. Everyone except BoJack appears oblivious to (or just does not care about) the fact that Vincent appears to be three children standing atop each other underneath a trench coat. Though he speaks in a child's voice and has awkward syntax, he also occasionally exhibits strangely keen insight, prompting others to ignore BoJack's observations.

In season 2, Princess Carolyn meets Kevin, who appears to be the top child of Vincent's trio. He tells Princess Carolyn that Kevin is Vincent's son, which she believes, but leads to them breaking up.

=== Wanda Pierce ===
Wanda Pierce (voiced by Lisa Kudrow) is a burrowing owl who is BoJack's girlfriend in season 2. She meets BoJack after reviving from a thirty-year coma. BoJack dates her because she has no idea who he is amidst his post-novel fame. She is a television executive for the MBN network and produces the gameshow Hollywoo Stars and Celebrities: What Do They Know? Do They Know Things?? Let's Find Out!. Wanda and BoJack break up due BoJack's bitterness and negativity. She was promoted immediately after coming out of the coma as "no one else had worked there that long." She eventually changes networks and is replaced by Pinky Penguin as executive.

It is revealed through a sight-gag in the series finale that she eventually went through a second coma.

=== Wayne ===
Wayne (voiced by Wyatt Cenac) is Diane's human ex-boyfriend who is a hipster and a BuzzFeed writer. He conspires with Diane to leak a small portion of BoJack's book to create hype and convince BoJack to allow its publication. They once worked together at Starbucks before Diane became a published author.

=== Woodchuck Coodchuck-Berkowitz ===
Woodcharles "Woodchuck" Coodchuck-Berkowitz (voiced by Andre Braugher) is the groundhog incumbent and level-headed governor of California. He is a graduate of Dartmouth College. He is bewildered by Mr. Peanutbutter's campaign. In some season four episodes, he replaces Tom Jumbo-Grumbo's image on the television during the party sequence in the theme song. Following the collapse of Mr. Peanutbutter's house, he digs down to save everyone inside which results in the loss of his hands. He briefly has his hands replaced with gorilla feet and then lobster claws, but later receives hand transplants from a pedophile/murderer named Ernest Contralto. He is forced to re-run for governor following Todd's victory in the skiing race in which he is the only experienced politician. He eventually beats Jessica Biel following the revelation that she hates avocados.

=== Yolanda Buenaventura ===
Yolanda Buenaventura (voiced by Natalie Morales) is an axolotl and employee of the Better Business Bureau sent to investigate Todd's clown dentist business. At the end of season 4 she becomes a potential love interest for Todd, revealing that she is also asexual and asking him on a date. After dating each other, the two end up breaking up but promise to get back together if they have not found love by the age of 100.

== Minor characters ==
- Abel Ziegler (voiced by Gabe Kaplan) – A human popsicle stick joke-writer, he threatens to sue Princess Carolyn for Flip's alleged plagiarism of one of his jokes.
- Abe D'Catfish (voiced by Garry Marshall) – A catfish director who replaces Kelsey Jannings after Lennie Turteltaub fires her. He and BoJack have butted heads causing BoJack to sneak out of LA to visit Charlotte Moore. This causes Abe and Lennie to use CGI to fill in for BoJack.
- Alexi Brosefino (voiced by Dave Franco). – He texts Diane about a party at his house thinking she was another woman with the same moniker. He gives Diane "Gush", a drug that gives her an epiphany of how much she loves Mr. Peanutbutter.
- Amanda Hannity (voiced by Christine Baranski) – A manatee who is editor-in-chief of Manatee Fair magazine.
- American Tourist (voiced by Randall Park) – A human tourist who runs into Diane in Hanoi and seems unable to understand that Diane is also American and can also speak English.
- Angela Diaz (voiced by Anjelica Huston) – A human executive for the studio that produces Horsin' Around. She gives BoJack a harsh speech about how the entertainment business works, persuading him to fire Herb, although in reality she and Disney CEO Michael Eisner have fired him for his homosexuality. She later contacts BoJack in the sixth season after details of his wrongdoings are made public, telling him how the studio is going to release new versions of his old show called "Around" because no one will watch any episodes if BoJack appears in them, and offering him a large settlement which he accepts. She then horrifies BoJack by telling him she was bluffing about Herb and wouldn't have fired him back then if BoJack had stood up to her, but dismisses his anger by saying he made his choices and has to live with them. While she only encounters BoJack twice in the series, these two encounters have a direct impact on BoJack's downfall.
- Angelica Buenaventura (voiced by Eva Longoria) – Yolanda's mother, an adult film star.
- Queen Antonia (voiced by RuPaul) – The queen of an ant colony living underneath Mr. Peanutbutter's house. She appears in the season 4 episode "Underground", where she is locked in a labor dispute with her female soldiers over sexual access to her male drones. She is shown to dislike surface dwellers and gentrification
- Biscuits Braxby (voiced by Daniele Gaither) – A chinchilla TV personality who softball interviews BoJack and Gina after an on-set incident. She later conducts a series of interviews with BoJack about his role in Sarah Lynn's death and, later, all of his many other wrongdoings. These interviews directly lead to BoJack being "canceled" by the general public.
- Mr. Buenaventura (voiced by John Leguizamo) – Yolanda's father, an erotic novelist who is unaware of his daughter's asexuality.
- Captain Peanutbutter (voiced by "Weird Al" Yankovic) – Mr. Peanutbutter's older brother who lives on the Labrador Peninsula. He makes microbrews and has a wife who runs Iditarod. During season 3, he reveals to Mr. Peanutbutter that he has a potentially fatal twisted spleen.
- Clemelia Bloodsworth (voiced by Natasha Rothwell) – A swan classmate of young Beatrice who was seen in a dementia flashback.
- The Closer (voiced by Candice Bergen) – An unseen sales executive of indeterminate species who patiently counsels BoJack through his personal problems over the phone as part of an elaborate last-ditch sales pitch to get him to re-subscribe to the L.A. Gazette.
- Commanding Officer (voiced by Khandi Alexander) – an LAPD Commanding Officer who is Meow Meow Fuzzyface's superior.
- Cooper Thomas Rogers Wallace, Jr. (voiced by Brian Tyree Henry) – A red fox who is the son of the family Princess Carolyn's mother works for. He winds up impregnating Princess Carolyn, but the pregnancy does not keep.
- Cooper Thomas Rogers Wallace, Sr. (voiced by Daveed Diggs) – Father of Cooper Thomas Rogers Wallace, Jr., also a fox, he is the heir to an answering machine tape fortune.
- Copernicus (voiced by Liev Schreiber) – A Persian cat who founded the improv theater troupe/cult, Shenanigags (which closely resembles Scientology). He takes a liking to Todd and knows dozens of jokes related to the butt. It is later revealed in "Out to Sea" that Copernicus is a fraud who exploits the improv workers on the cruise ships and steals his butt jokes from a joke book. Copernicus is thematically a parody of the founder of Scientology L. Ron Hubbard and visually a parody of Del Close.
- Cuddlywhiskers (voiced by Jeffrey Wright) – A Syrian hamster and Hollywoo producer who created Krill & Grace and The BoJack Horseman Show. He attended Harvard, where he was president of the Lampoon.
- Cutie Cutie Cupcake (voiced by David Sedaris) – Princess Carolyn's mother. She is the alcoholic live-in housekeeper to the wealthy Wallace family of Eden, North Carolina. She is depicted in flashbacks when princess Carolyn returns to Eden to meet a prospective birth parent for an adoption.
- Eddie (voiced by Colman Domingo) – A widower dragonfly contractor who lives across from the old Sugarman house in Michigan. He befriends BoJack while repairing the house.
- Erica (unvoiced) – A workplace acquaintance to Mr. Peanutbutter, never seen or heard, but frequently referenced and called out to by him while off screen.
- Gary (voiced by Patton Oswalt) – Diane's adopted sheep brother, a literal black sheep of the family.
- Greg (voice actor unknown) – A man that Mr. Peanutbutter met at the gas station once. Sheds a tear when Mr. Peanutbutter says he does not like him in Surprise! (season 6 episode 4)
- The Grip (voiced by James Duval) – An bald eagle grip working on location in Hanoi who mistakenly believes Diane can't speak English and begins a brief romance with her. He is angered when he discovers she could understand him the entire time.
- Heather (voiced by Natasha Leggero) – A manatee reporter for Manatee Fair who winds up sleeping with BoJack while writing an article on him. He accidentally confesses to her that Secretariat was finished using a CGI double of him after he walked out on filming.
- Hedgehog at Orphanage (voiced by Ricky Gervais) – A British-accented hedgehog who runs the Jerb Kazzaz Memorial Orphanage, intended as Herb Kazzaz but misspelled due to BoJack's email.
- Henrietta Platchkey (voiced by Majandra Delfino) – Hollyhock's human mother, and former maid of the Horseman family, only remembered by Beatrice with scribbles in place of her face.
- Dr. Indira (voiced by Issa Rae) – Diane's psychotherapist, she has a tendency to openly discuss her patients' issues with other people by only marginally changing their names and identifying characteristics.
- Irving Jannings (voiced by Amy Schumer) – Kelsey's daughter.
- Dr. Janet (voiced by Lorraine Bracco) – A human marriage counselor providing couples therapy to Mr. Peanutbutter and Diane, as well Rutabaga and his wife Katie. Although modeled on Bracco's portrayal of Dr. Jennifer Melfi from The Sopranos, she is more sardonic and direct in her manner and uses a police siren to signal that time has run out in the therapy session.
- Jagger Waggoner (voiced by Samantha Bee) – Vance Waggoner’s daughter. Shown to have had a verbally abusive father growing up, who still harasses her in the present day despite divorcing her mother and her growing up and moving out to go to college.
- Jeremiah Whitewhale (voiced by Stephen Root) – The albino sperm whale head of business conglomerate Whitewhale Enterprises.
- Jill Pill (voiced by Mara Wilson) – A black widow spider playwright who was Cuddlywhiskers' assistant and former lover. Her real name is Jill Filipowitz.
- Joelle Clarke (voiced by Alison Brie) – A human actress who played the Horse's eldest adopted daughter Olivia on Horsin' Around. In "Still Broken", it is revealed Joelle is living in England. It is mentioned in season three that Joelle missed five episodes of Horsin' Around due to an anorexia problem (a possible reference to Growing Pains actress Tracey Gold's real-life problem while on that show).
- Jorge Chavez (voiced by Jaime Camil) – Todd's serious, disciplinarian human stepfather, from whom Todd is estranged. He considers Todd a failure due to his frequent shenanigans, despite Todd claiming to be happy with his life. As a Latino, he has often struggled in his life and only achieved success through strict discipline. He tried to enforce the same on Todd, but then remembers that Todd is white.
- Judge (voiced by Phil LaMarr) – A sea otter judge who presides over BoJack's jury duty case in season 1, Todd's Disneyland copyright infringement case in season 2, and briefly swears Todd in as California governor in season 4.
- Jurj Clooners (voiced by Jay Mohr) – A lawyer-friendly version of George Clooney. He is an actor who stars in The Nazi Who Played Yahtzee, and is a huge fan of pranks.
- Kyle (voiced by Ed Helms) – Charlotte's human husband and the father of Trip and Penny.
- Laura (voiced by Rachel Bloom) – Princess Carolyn's secretary in season one. She is replaced by a male assistant named Stuart in season two, but makes a brief non-speaking cameo appearance in "Higher Love." She later returns as director David Pincher's personal assistant in season three. She sabotages BoJack's chance to appear in a Pegasus movie after Vanessa Gecko reveals to her that Princess Carolyn intentionally prevented Laura's promotion.
- Lion Musician (voiced by Keith David) – A lion clarinetist who performs in the same symphony as Todd.
- Maddy Ginsberg (voiced by Ali Wong) – Penny's human best friend who attends prom with her and BoJack, along with her boyfriend Pete. She passes out after getting drunk on alcohol obtained by BoJack, who abandons her and Pete at the hospital. She is later revealed to have survived after having her stomach pumped.
- Marcy (voiced by Kathy Najimy) – The human former president of BoJack's fan club who BoJack believes might be Hollyhock's mother.
- Marty (voiced by Larry Clarke), Artie (voiced by Mike O'Malley), and Tommy Nguyen (voiced by Adam Conover) – Diane's three biological brothers who live with their parents in Boston. As with all of her family, they are selfish, rude, and obsessed with sports. Diane and BoJack go out to see them when Diane's father dies, and while they regularly insult Diane, they quickly bond with BoJack. However, upon realizing how poorly they treat Diane, BoJack quickly becomes disillusioned with them.
- Marv Sbarbori (voiced by Paul F. Tompkins) – Princess Carolyn's boss at Vigor Agency back in 2007.
- Mary-Beth (voiced by Wanda Sykes) – Dr. Indira's spouse, she is a corporate mediator brought on to resolve a workplace dispute between Princess Carolyn and Todd over a stolen piece of string cheese.
- Maximillian Banks (voiced by Max Greenfield) – A human reporter at the Hollywoo who investigates Sarah Lynn's death along with Paige Sinclair. He is less intelligent than her and harbors clear romantic feelings for her.
- Mia McKibbin (voiced by Tatiana Maslany) – A mouse who works at the game show. She tries to earn the respect of J.D. Salinger and finds Todd extremely immature. A Stanford grad, she has a cameo in a season 3 waiting in line at Starbucks behind Mr. Peanutbutter.
- Mindy Buenaventura (voiced by Natalie Morales) – Yolanda's identical twin sister, a sex advice columnist.
- Mikaela (voiced by Whoopi Goldberg) – A stork adoption agency worker.
- Mother Superior (voiced by Audra McDonald) – A peregrine falcon nun in whose oceanside convent Margo Martindale has been cared for in a catatonic state.
- Neal McBeal (voiced by Patton Oswalt) – A harbor seal who is a Navy Seal and a veteran of War in Afghanistan. He gets into a public feud with BoJack over a box of muffins.
- Mrs. Nguyen (voiced by Melissa Leo) – Diane's alcoholic mother. She frequently insults Diane the same way her sons do.
- Oxnard (voiced by Jake Johnson) – Mr. Peanutbutter's meerkat accountant. He is frequently driven to madness by Mr. Peanutbutter's harebrained business schemes. We occasionally see his son at his side, whose relationship is strained by the main characters' antics.
- Pastiches Receptionist (voiced by Will Choi) – The cheerful groundhog receptionist of BoJack's rehab facility, Pastiches, who insist on taking selfies with each new patient.
- Peter Pocket (voiced by Jermaine Fowler) – A human friend of Penny's who attends prom with her and BoJack, along with his girlfriend Maddy. BoJack leaves him and Maddy at the hospital after Maddy gets drunk and passes out. In season 6, Peter encounters Hollyhock at a party in New York City.
- Pig Doctor (voiced by Patton Oswalt) – An unnamed pig physician.
- Quentin Tarantulino (voiced by Kevin Bigley) – A tarantula who is a film director. He is a parody of Quentin Tarantino. He is known for revitalizing the careers of dead actors, and works on the Mr. Peanutbutter film before turning it into a snack box.
- Richie Osborne (voiced by Fred Savage) – A human actor who played Goober on Horsin' Around who always shows up to the Horse's house unannounced, leading everyone to say "Go home, Goober!" BoJack mentioned that Richie once got in trouble with the law for molesting the Laker Girls. When he grows up, Richie is the owner of a strip club with killer whale dancers.
- Ruthie (voiced by Kristen Bell) – Princess Carolyn's imaginary descendant, who presents a report to her robot teacher, Miss Teach-Bot (also voiced by Kristin Chenoweth).
- Sadie (voiced by Jaime Pressly) – A human young woman that lives in Eden, North Carolina, from whom Princess Carolyn is hoping to adopt. She is pregnant by her ex-boyfriend Strib.
- Sandro (voiced by Paul F. Tompkins) – The human head chef at BoJack's restaurant Elefante. He displays several stereotypical Italian mannerisms and speaks in heavily accented malapropisms.
- Skinny Gina (voiced by Constance Zimmer) – A killer whale exotic dancer who works for Goober's killer whale gentleman's club, "Whale World." She later goes to work for Todd at Cabracadabra.
- Strib (voiced by Brian Tyree Henry) – A North American porcupine who is Sadie's ex-boyfriend.
- Tilda Madison (voiced by Archie Panjabi) – A Sphynx cat actress who BoJack had sex with in the '90s and who Hollyhock believes might be her mother.
- Tracy (voiced by Nicole Sullivan) – A character in Horsin' Around who works as Mr. Libertore's secretary.
- Trip (voiced by Adam Pally) – Charlotte's human son who is the teenage brother of Penny.
- Unnamed News Reporter (voiced by Chris Parnell) – A bald news reporter sporting a goatee who regularly covers celebrity-centric news.
- Waiter (voiced by Baron Vaughn) – An unnamed human waiter who works at BoJack's restaurant Elefante, he is forced to become head chef after Sandro abruptly quits.
- Waitress (voiced by Alison Brie) – An unnamed cow waitress with a bad attitude. Eventually, Todd accidentally tips her eight million dollars. She remains a waitress following this tip.
- WhatTimeIsItRightNow.com CEO (voiced by Isiah Whitlock, Jr.) – A cougar who resigns his position as CEO of WhatTimesIsItRightNow.com after being persuaded to by Henry Fondle.
- Mr. Witherspoon (voiced by Stephen Colbert) – A bullfrog who heads the Vigor agency in seasons 1 and 2. He is Princess Carolyn's boss and the father of Charley Witherspoon. His entrance is usually accompanied by trombone music. In "Out to Sea", it was mentioned that Mr. Witherspoon suffered a stroke. He dies sometime between "Out to Sea" and "Old Acquaintances" as a result of his medical condition.
- Ziggy Abler (voiced by Richard Lewis) – Abel's markhor joke-writing partner.
- Zoë and Zelda (both voiced by Kelen Coleman) – The twins who were raised by Mr. Peanutbutter on Mr. Peanutbutter's House. A recurring gag in season one was identifying who was a "Zoë" and who was a "Zelda". Creator Raphael Bob-Waksberg based them on the main characters of Sister, Sister and the phenomenon of people identifying as either a "Tia" or a "Tamara".

== Celebrities ==
Celebrities appear on the show either as humans or anthropomorphic animal versions. In all of the cases below, the celebrities have voiced themselves:

- Carla Hall – Introduced as a "Spaghetti Scientist", she provides a live tutorial on MSNBSea on how to save Pacific Ocean City from being smothered by twelve tons of cooked spaghetti.
- Chloë Grace Moretz - Plays the lead in Flea Daniels' The Diary of Anne Frankenstein.
- Cindy Crawfish – A crawfish version of Cindy Crawford.
- Daniel Radcliffe – An exaggerated version of the actor, appearing as the surprise celebrity guest for the premiere of Mr. Peanutbutter's game show. He does not like BoJack and has fun mangling his name on purpose, at various points referring to him as B. J. Novak and Chadwick Boseman among others.
- David Chase – The creator of Untitled Horsin' Around Knockoff, later renamed Mr. Peanutbutter's House.
- Felicity Huffman – Lives in the house under BoJack's house and is annoyed with all the things that are thrown into her yard. Hosts a reality show called FHBA: Los Angeles, which is short for Felicity Huffman Booty Academy: Los Angeles.
- Flea Daniels - A flea version of Lee Daniels who later directs The Diary of Anne Frankenstein.
- Greg Kinnear – Plays a marionette version of himself in Jill Pill's immersive theatre production of "The Tragedie of Greg Kinglear."
- Henry Winkler – Best known for his guest spot on Law & Order: SVU, he gives the eulogy at Herb Kazzaz's funeral. During a discussion with Princess Carolyn, he says he knew Kazzaz when they worked for Habitat for Humanity. Henry, and Herb's caretaker Tina, kept Kazzaz's terrible novel manuscript from being posthumously published and tainting Kazzaz's legacy.
- Jay Hernandez - Pretends to be in rehab as Mario to research a role for an upcoming Zack Snyder film.
- Jeanne Tripplehorn - Pretends to be her identical twin "Joan Tripplehorn" while in rehab.
- Jessica Biel – Mr. Peanutbutter's second wife in 2007, who frequently speaks in the third person and later divorces him to be with Justin Timberlake. She attends the fundraiser for Peanutbutter's gubernatorial campaign during the season 4 episode "Underground" and becomes trapped in the wreckage of Peanutbutter's house after a fracking accident causes it to collapse into a cave. Whilst underground, she forms a cult dedicated to worshipping fire and burns Zach Braff alive in ritual sacrifice. She intends to burn Peanutbutter afterwards, but is accidentally stopped by BoJack and Diane. She later teams up with Peanutbutter's other ex-wife, Katrina, and runs for governor so she can get back at Mr. Peanutbutter. Despite Katrina's best efforts, Biel ends up losing the election to the incumbent Woodchuck Coodchuck-Berkowitz after Biel's hatred for avocado is leaked to the public, an "offense the people of California cannot stand".
- Jorge Garcia – BoJack is briefly seen talking to him in 2007 about Lost.
- Lance Bass – Depicted as a bass fish, he is a celebrity guest on Mr. Peanutbutter's game show.
- Laura Linney – Sits next to Diane on her flight back from Vietnam, where she is on location filming a movie.
- Leonard Maltin – Hosts the eponymous Leonard Maltin Awards.
- "Character Actress" Margo Martindale – An exaggerated, criminally insane version of actress Margo Martindale who willingly goes along with BoJack's schemes no matter how convoluted or dangerous. She is always referred to by other characters as "Character Actress Margo Martindale", rather than simply by her name. In season 1, she is arrested helping BoJack fake a bank robbery in order to steal Diane's engagement ring, and is incarcerated in Hollywoo Hills Super-Max Prison. In "Later", Margo was seen in the prison's cafeteria talking to her fellow inmates that resemble the characters from Orange is the New Black. In season 2's "The Shot", the audience sees Margo get released early from prison due to good behavior. Later in the same episode, Margo gets involved in a shootout with the Yorba Linda police in order to distract them from BoJack's unauthorized use of the Richard Nixon Presidential Library for his movie Secretariat. When the police recognize her face but do not recall her name, she opens fire on them in the name of often-unrecognized fellow character actors like John Carroll Lynch and C.C.H. Pounder. In season 3, it is revealed in flashbacks that she was BoJack's co-star on The BoJack Horseman Show. In "Stop the Presses", it is revealed that she has been hiding out on BoJack's boat since the previous season's shootout in Yorba Linda, during which time she starred in a regional production of a Tennessee Williams play while also doing a character arc as Ruth Eastman on The Good Wife. She eventually steals BoJack's boat and a papier-mâché version of Todd's head and flees into international waters. During the season 3 finale, "That Went Well", she is shown to have become delusional after weeks alone in the open sea, believing that the papier-mâché Todd-head is called "Skippy" and that it speaks to her. In her delusions, she causes an accident with the Cargot Cartinadale, a cargo ship carrying tons of pasta, resulting in an environmental disaster which Mr. Peanutbutter ends up resolving. In an MSNBSea newscrawl in season 4, it is revealed that she is still lost at sea and presumed dead. In season 5, it is revealed she was found alive by a remote convent with amnesia, with them unaware of her identity. However, when she sees a giant floating balloon of BoJack, she begins screaming his name. In season 6, Margo regains her memory and becomes a nun, but leaves the convent in a priest's Alfa Romeo. She later returns for one last scheme, pretending to kidnap Todd and Maude so that Todd can reconnect with his estranged mother. She does this to make amends for having helped ruin Todd's rock opera, and later claims that all of her escapades throughout the whole series were one long ruse to help Todd and his mother reunite.
- Mark Feuerstein – Publicly vouches for Vance Waggoner after he is accused of anti-semitism, and agrees to a supporting role in Waggoner's next movie.
- Sir Mix-a-Lot – A judge on Felicity Huffman's buttocks-related reality show.
- Naomi Watts – An exaggerated version of the actress, she plays Diane in Mr. Peanutbutter's film. While in character as Diane, she engages in a fast-paced sexual relationship with BoJack only to lose interest in him when her character is ultimately written out of the movie and replaced with a ball on a stick. Naomi advises she is tired of playing well-rounded female characters, and only initially takes the Mr. Peanutbutter film due to its one-dimensional portrayal of Diane.
- Neil deGrasse Tyson – Narrated the light show at the planetarium in S3 E11 "That's Too Much, Man!"
- Paul Giamatti – Portrays BoJack in the TV miniseries The Sarah Lynn Story, something BoJack is shown to have issue with.
- Paul McCartney – He appears out of a cake Mr. Peanutbutter made for Diane's surprise party, but only at the end of the episode once everyone else has left.
- Samantha Bee - A bumblebee version of Bee, host of Full Frontal with Samantha Bee on T-Bee-S.
- Scott Wolf – Despite his surname, Scott is depicted as a red fox. He is a presenter at the 1994 Animals' Choice Awards, where he and Matthew Fox present the award for Male Animal in a Comedy, Drama or Variety Show to Hank Hippopopalous.
- Sharc Jacobs – A shark version of Marc Jacobs.
- Tim Gunn – Attends Sharc Jacobs' fashion show.
- Vincent D'Onofrio – The original star of Untitled Horsin' Around Knockoff, later recast with Mr. Peanutbutter.
- Wallace Shawn – An exaggerated version of the real life actor; plays BoJack in Mr. Peanutbutter's film.
- Wiz Khalifa – Presents the Oscar for Best Song to an absent Sarah Lynn.
- Zach Braff – Appears at Mr. Peanutbutter's gubernatorial fundraiser, and constantly tries to get his parking validated after Mr. Peanutbutter's house goes underground. He is killed when Jessica Biel sets him on fire and his corpse is eaten by the starving partygoers. He later appears at the end of the series as one of many deceased people from BoJack's past with whom he reconnects during his hallucination following his near-death experience.

Some other real-life celebrities appear, but are voiced by other actors:

- Andrew Garfield (voiced by Paul F. Tompkins) – Sarah Lynn's celebrity boyfriend with whom she has an on-again off-again relationship. He is depicted as sharing traits with the comic character Garfield, including a dislike of Mondays and a craving for lasagna.
- Beyoncé (voiced by Yvette Nicole Brown) – Beyoncé appears in "Our A-Story Is a 'D' Story" where she trips and falls on dollar bills that BoJack threw off a roof.
- Cameron Crowe (voiced by Kevin Bigley) – Depicted as a Raven, Princess Carolyn meets with him to discuss the Eva Braun movie that she wants Cate Blanchett to star in.
- Charlie Rose (voiced by Patton Oswalt) – He interviews BoJack Horseman in "BoJack Horseman: The BoJack Horseman Story, Chapter One".
- Derek Jeter (voiced by Chris Cox) – A shortstop for the New York Yankees baseball team. He briefly appears walking an old lady across the street, only to rob her when she is hit by the chum bucket holding Diane's father's remains.
- J. D. Salinger (voiced by Alan Arkin) – In the universe of this show, The Catcher in the Rye author J.D. Salinger faked his death and opened a tandem bicycle shop. He was a client of the late Ronnie Bonito. After learning that he is still alive, Princess Carolyn convinces him to work in television where he creates a game show that Mr. Peanutbutter hosts called Hollywoo Stars and Celebrities: What Do They Know? Do They Know Things?? Let's Find Out!. In "Start Spreading the News", he pulls the plug on Mr. Peanutbutter's game show, feeling that his work is done on the project. In the same episode, he also leaves Princess Carolyn's new agency for Gekko-Rabitowitz.
- Matthew Fox (voiced by Chris Diamantopoulos) – Despite his surname, Matthew is depicted as a gray wolf. He is depicted as being nearly feral and unable to articulate speech. Matthew is a presenter at the 1994 Animals' Choice Awards alongside Scott Wolf.
- Secretariat (voiced by John Krasinski) – A racehorse and BoJack's hero. In the show, he was banned for life from racing when there were allegations that he had been betting on his own races. After being disgraced, Secretariat committed suicide by jumping off the John F. Kennedy Memorial Bridge into the Ohio River. His brother Jeffretariat was killed in the Vietnam War. A version of Secretariat, with Secretariat's appearance, Butterscotch Horseman's voice, and his personality and experiences being a combination of the two, appears among other deceased people from BoJack's past during a hallucination in "The View From Halfway Down."

Also as a running gag through the series, Diane's ringtone is voiced by several personalities from public radio or podcasts:

- In season one, Diane's ringtone is voiced by Ira Glass.
- In season two, Diane's ringtone is voiced by Sarah Koenig.
- In season three, Diane's ringtone is voiced by Terry Gross and Jonathan Lethem.
- In season four, Diane's ringtone is voiced by Audie Cornish and Robert Siegel.
- In season five, Diane's ringtone is voiced by Peter Sagal.
- In season six, Diane's ringtone is voiced by Michael Barbaro.
