= BoJack Horseman (character) =

Fictional title character of BoJack Horseman

- BoJack Horseman character
- First appearance: "BoJack Horseman: The BoJack Horseman Story, Chapter One" (2014)
- Last appearance: "Nice While It Lasted" (2020)
- Created by: Raphael Bob-Waksberg
- Designed by: Lisa Hanawalt
- Voiced by: Will Arnett

In-universe information
- Full name: BoJack F. Horseman
- Alias: The Horse from Horsin' Around
- Species: Horse (Thoroughbred)
- Gender: Male
- Occupation: Actor
- Family: Butterscotch Horseman (father; deceased); Beatrice Horseman (mother; deceased); Hollyhock Manheim-Mannheim-Guerrero-Robinson-Zilberschlag-Hsung-Fonzarelli-McQuack (paternal half-sister)
- Significant others: Princess Carolyn (ex-girlfriend); Wanda Pierce (ex-girlfriend); Sarah Lynn (occasional sex); Ana Spanikopita (ex-lover); Gina Cazador (ex-girlfriend)
- Relatives: Joseph Sugarman (maternal grandfather; deceased); Honey Sugarman (maternal grandmother; deceased); Crackerjack Sugarman (maternal uncle; deceased)

BoJack F. Horseman is a fictional character and the titular protagonist of the eponymous American animated television series. He is voiced by Will Arnett and was created by Raphael Bob-Waksberg. Prior to the time the series takes place in, BoJack had starred in a fictional hit 1990s sitcom called Horsin' Around. After the show ended, BoJack struggled to find acting work, instead living off residuals from Horsin' Around's syndication.

BoJack, a self-loathing and alcoholic anthropomorphic narcissistic Thoroughbred horse, has depression and often engages in self-destructive behavior. He frequently drinks, takes drugs to excess, and has difficulty maintaining positive relationships with others.

== Fictional biography ==
BoJack Horseman was born in San Francisco on January 2, 1964. His acting career peaked in the late 1980s to mid 1990s with the sitcom, Horsin' Around, about a bachelor horse caring for three orphaned human children, and was stagnant until The BoJack Horseman Show debuted in 2007. This new edgier show was canceled after only one season for both its abysmal ratings and critical polarization. Though he began as a bright-eyed young actor, he had since grown bitter, deeply depressed, and jaded towards Hollywoo and who he had become post-fame. BoJack had been shown to be caring and insightful, but his insecurities, loneliness, and desperate need for approval often result in self-destructive actions that devastate those around him. Many of his issues stem from substance abuse (drugs and alcohol), decisions he has made throughout his career, personal vices, and issues with his unhappy parents during childhood.

=== Seasons 1–2 ===
In Season 1, BoJack makes a comeback attempt, trying to act once again. He receives an advance to write a memoir, but after difficulties starting, his publisher hires Diane Nguyen as his ghostwriter as she had already written a biography on BoJack's childhood hero, Secretariat . Throughout the season, BoJack gets on the news when he calls the troops "jerks", sabotages Todd's Rock opera, and drunkenly steals the Hollywood D, changing the name of the city to 'Hollywoo' throughout the rest of the show.

At one point, BoJack attempts to apologize to his old friend, Herb Kazzaz, who is dying from cancer, with whom he originally created Horsin' Around. BoJack feels guilt over the fact that he did not defend Herb after he was fired in the 90s after being outed as gay. However, because BoJack had abandoned him, took such a long time to make an effort to apologize, and his apology was insincere, Herb rejects his apology and refuses to forgive BoJack. This event, as well as subsequently wrestling with Herb over a telescope (the telescope broke during their fight) after Herb kicks BoJack out of his house followed by exclaiming that BoJack is "a selfish goddamn coward who takes whatever he wants and doesn't give a shit about who he hurts" is shown to deeply affect BoJack for the remainder of his life.

Despite difficulty during the writing process, the book receives positive reviews, and brings BoJack back into the spotlight once more, with him even winning an award for his memoir.

In Season 2, he lands the role of Secretariat in a biopic of the titular famous horse racer, and dates a female owl network executive named Wanda, who had just awakened from a 20 year coma. However, he struggles with the main role of Secretariat. With the production in jeopardy, he inadvertently causes Secretariat's director, Kelsey Jannings, to be fired after sneaking in with her to the Nixon library, attempting to illegally film a scene for the movie to be as accurate as possible. Jannings is subsequently replaced by a director who is more subservient to the producers' demands.

After spending time in the fictional country Cordovia, Diane becomes disillusioned, eventually wanting to return home, but terrified to face her then-husband Mr. Peanutbutter. She begins spiraling into depression, and asks BoJack if she can stay at his house, which he agrees to.

The new director of Secretariat becomes spiteful towards BoJack, after BoJack insults him for his creative vision. Wanda breaks up with him due to his habitual negativity and bitterness. Following this, he has a conversation with Diane about the last time he was truly happy. He resolves to escape his troubles, leaving for New Mexico, where he reconnects with his old friend Charlotte. She reveals to him she is now happily married to her husband, Kyle, with whom she has her two kids, Penny and Trip.

As a cover-up for his real motivations for coming to New Mexico, he purchases a yacht, which he parks in their driveway with their approval. Unwilling to return to LA, he stays with Charlotte's family for two months, and becomes very close with them, especially Penny. BoJack even accompanies Penny and her two friends, Maddy and Pete, to their prom, where he gets both of them drunk. As a result, Maddy gets alcohol poisoning, and BoJack manipulates Pete into staying silent, out of fear that the event could negatively impact his acting career and public reputation.

Later, Penny makes a pass at BoJack, rationalizing that it's alright for them to have sex, because she's reached the age of consent in New Mexico (17). BoJack initially rejects her advances. Later that night, he and Charlotte kiss, and she asks him to leave by the morning. Charlotte then finds Bojack in bed with Penny. Charlotte sends Penny to her room and threatens to call the cops on BoJack if he doesn't leave. She also threatens to murder him if he ever contacts her or family again. He returns to his life and home in Los Angeles.

He discovers the new director finished shooting Secretariat and used a CGI version of BoJack instead of the real him during post-production. The film is a critical and commercial hit upon its release.

=== Seasons 3–5 ===
In Season 3, BoJack's role in Secretariat earns him an Oscar nomination and has Anna help him win an Oscar award, though it is later revealed to be a mistake. Subsequently, he and his roommate, Todd Chavez, have a falling out over BoJack's transgressions he committed against Todd. As a result, Todd calls BoJack out on his habitual toxic behaviors and is no longer friends with him. BoJack then copes by going on a drug-induced bender with his friend and former co-star in Horsin' Around, Sarah Lynn, which results in her death. Despite being hired again to do a sequel show to Horsin' Around, BoJack runs away fearing he will corrupt his female child co-star like Sarah Lynn after a child actor on set tells BoJack she wants to be like him when she grows up and nearly attempts vehicular suicide on a highway, but stops upon seeing a group of cross-country running horses.

In Season 4, he comes to terms with Sarah Lynn's death after months of avoiding the public eye at his old grandparents' summer lake house in Michigan and meets with Hollyhock, a young horse who at first believes BoJack to be her biological father, but is later revealed to be his half-sister as a result of an affair between BoJack's father and his parents' maid. He also deals with his mother suffering from dementia. His mother lives with him after getting kicked out of her nursing home for a while until BoJack put her in a different nursing home when he discovered she was spiking Hollyhock's drinks with dangerous weight loss pills out of dismay for her weight, resulting in her passing out on BoJack's bathroom floor and being hospitalized. BoJack lands the starring title role on Philbert, an original detective web-series that streams on WhatTimeIsItRightNow.com.

In Season 5, while working on Philbert, BoJack has an existential crisis about how Philbert intersects with many aspects of his personal life and begins dating co-star Gina Cazador. During the show's production, he suffers an on-set accident and develops an addiction to the painkillers he is prescribed to manage the pain from his injuries.

The first season of Philbert becomes a huge success, and production of season 2 begins almost immediately; during this time, however, BoJack's drug problem worsens until one day on set, while heavily under the influence of painkillers (and likely Philbert-based schizophrenia), he chokes Gina and forgets shortly after. Princess Carolyn shows BoJack a video that was taken of him choking Gina on set for him to understand the gravity of what he did.

Out of contrition, BoJack wants to tell the truth in a cover-up interview alongside Gina hosted by Biscuits Braxby. Gina doesn't want him to because she doesn't want to be known as the "girl who was choked by BoJack" for the rest of her career. Despite Gina not pressing criminal charges on BoJack, remaining silent on him strangling her, and still willing to work with him, she cuts off personal ties with him before their interview with Biscuits. Season 5 ends with Philbert getting cancelled due to Todd's robot CEO facing sexual allegations, and BoJack checking himself into rehab with Diane's transport and urging.

=== Season 6 ===
In the first half of Season 6, he is seen as having been healed significantly as a result of his 6 month stint in rehab. In the season six episode "The Face of Depression", it is revealed he has been coloring his hair black for the last 20 years; the real color of his hair is grey. At the end of this episode, BoJack accepts a role as a drama teacher at Wesleyan University, where Hollyhock is a student, after Raven-Symoné removes herself from consideration.

He enjoys this new job and humble life, forging a deep connection with his students and discovering a newfound love of teaching. He struggles to connect with Hollyhock, despite attending her rugby games and even learning how rugby works. Hollyhock learns over winter break about BoJack intoxicating Maddy to excess, causing her to get alcohol poisoning, and how he silenced Pete in New Mexico, though she does not directly confront him on this.

In the second half of season 6, after a student actor showcase with Diane, Princess Carolyn, and Todd in attendance, BoJack receives a phone call from Charlotte telling him that reporters have been pestering her and Penny in their home for information about his time in New Mexico and orders him to get rid of them; this gives BoJack an anxiety attack and causes him to come to terms with the fact that details of his past are about to come to light. Todd and Diane start to notice BoJack reverting back to his old ways and are concerned the fears of BoJack getting exposed for his past mistakes are getting to his head. The following week, the Hollywoo Reporter publishes an article providing all the details of Sarah Lynn's death, revealing to the public for the first time BoJack's complicity in it.

BoJack attempts to capitalize on an upcoming interview with Biscuit Braxby regarding his role in Sarah Lynn's death. While initially receiving praise for his honesty during his first interview, he is effectively "canceled" after the second interview (also with Braxby) uncovers his influential erratic relationships with women in his circle, including Sarah Lynn, and his true culpability: he waited 17 minutes to call the ambulance to save Sarah Lynn, as well as his defensiveness towards Braxby lambasting him for his past transgressions. BoJack hits rock-bottom, losing his teaching job, his house, all his money, his relationship with Hollyhock, and is overall blackballed in Hollywood.

BoJack moves in with Mr. Peanutbutter, who is ecstatic to have him live with him. He forms an unlikely friendship with fellow "canceled" actor Vance Waggoner, who encourages him to channel his anger into work, which culminates in them creating their first project together, a bawdy, low-brow comedy film called The Horny Unicorn.

BoJack is eventually contacted by Angela Diaz, the network executive who intimidated him into keeping silent about Herb's outing in the 1990s during the apex of Horsin' Around. She informs BoJack that the network is releasing new versions of Horsin' Around with all his scenes cut out, but they are bad, so she proposes to BoJack that he sign a contract giving away his residual rights. He is reluctant at first as he needs the residuals more than ever, before Angela reveals they will pay him a large sum of money to get him back on his feet and goads him to take up drinking alcohol again after signing away his residual credit. BoJack gets drunk with her and "realizes" that Angela's manipulation of him into "allowing" Herb's firing is what ruined his friendship with Herb.

When she rebuffs his condemnation and retorts they were equally opportunistic, BoJack gives in to his despair, takes one of Angela's cars as a "signing bonus" along with multiple copies of Horsin' Around on Blu-Ray DVD, drives intoxicated to his old home, drives through the gate, makes his way into the house and reverts back to his old habits.

After attempting to contact Diane with a casually desperate voice mail, BoJack attempts suicide by overdosing on pills he steals from the medicine cabinet of his old bathroom and drowning in his old swimming pool, experiencing a near-death experience in which he faces his shattered life through visions of a dinner and show starring his deceased family and associates, hosted by Herb himself. He ultimately ends the vision in a conversation with a distal version of Diane over the Horsin' set phone as black tar swallows him whole.

==== Series finale ====
Later that night, BoJack's body is found in the pool by the family who now owns and resides in the house. While he is initially thought to be dead, he wakes up in the hospital some time later handcuffed to his hospital bed. He is charged, tried, and sentenced to 14 months in prison for breaking and entering, and his career is effectively ended.

Roughly a year later, he is released from prison for a weekend (although he does end up going back to prison early) to attend Princess Carolyn's and Judah's wedding.

Once out, he learns his suicide attempt and prison sentence has taught society to forgive him and offer him another chance at being an actor. Over the course of that day, he shares a reconciling moment with each of his friends before concluding his prison sentence: he shares a drive with Mr. Peanutbutter, who tries to return the D to the Hollywood sign (though he accidentally orders a B, renaming it Hollywoob); he reconnects with Todd at the beach, who tells him that he has turned his life around and assures BoJack that he can too; and he shares a heartfelt dance with Princess Carolyn where they thank each other for what they have done for each other's careers and lives overall.

She is optimistic for his future prospects, revealing The Horny Unicorn was a massive success and everyone wants him to go back to acting, saying she will recommend some excellent managers to him when he is released from prison.

Finally, he has a conversation on the rooftop with Diane, who tells him about the voice message he left her before his suicide attempt. She tells him that while she is relieved that he is alive, she was angry that she let him exert so much power over her. BoJack apologizes for the pain he has caused her, but learns she has become a fairly successful young adult novelist and re-married, this time to Guy.

BoJack reveals despite being uncancelled, that he is not going back to acting, but plans to become a full-time acting coach and philanthropist, because he has discovered he genuinely loves helping others and to make up for all his past misdeeds. Diane tells him that she is grateful for knowing him and for her time in LA because they made her who she is, but she deems that time a past version of her, and explains that people can still be grateful for others' influence without them being in their life forever.

BoJack hesitantly wonders if this is their last conversation together, to which she thanks him for their experience. He displays growth over the fact that the people who make him the happiest may not be in his life forever and is happy Diane has moved on with her life, even though they may never see each other again after this. He offers a parting sardonic story about his prison's "movie night", and the series ends with BoJack and Diane sharing a quiet heartfelt moment together under the stars.

== Development ==
Creator Raphael Bob-Waksberg came up with initial kernel of BoJack as the "story of a guy who's had every opportunity imaginable, but still can't find a way to be happy, and what is that about for him?" BoJack's house and overall emotional arc were inspired by Bob-Waksberg's first house in Los Angeles, where he felt "on top of the world and also never more isolated or alone." Bob-Waksberg considered other ideas for BoJack's occupation like him being a former racehorse before deciding on him being a former actor. Supervising director Mike Hollingsworth noted that a former actor can still act in their later life but aging does not allow for athletes to continue successfully when they are older.

== Reception ==
Actor Will Arnett, who voices BoJack, stated in an interview with Vanity Fair that he was drawn to playing the character due to his deep character flaws, namely his emotional scarring, and that he believes BoJack is both lovable and unlovable at the same time. Arnett has received praise for his portrayal of BoJack and ability to balance comedy with emotion, especially in the fifth-season episode "Free Churro", which consists almost entirely of a eulogy that BoJack delivers for his mother at her funeral. Screen Rant ranked the character as the fifth most likeable in the show, opining that despite his narcissism, he is "smart, cynical, and direct".

== See also ==
- List of BoJack Horseman characters
- List of fictional horses
