= Fielding Edlow =

American actress and comedian

- Medium: Stand-up, improv, television
- Website: fieldingedlow.com

Fielding Edlow is a comedian, actress, and writer who has appeared in BoJack Horseman, Get Shorty and Behind The Candelabra. She grew up in New York City and attended the Neighborhood Playhouse.

She was trained at the Upright Citizens Brigade. In 2008, she married American actor Larry Clarke with whom she has one daughter. They amicably divorced in 2023. Fielding created Bitter Homes and Gardens, a comedy web-series in which the couple star as a narcissistic Hollywood couple who relentlessly demean each other's careers and achievements. Fielding's half-hour comedy special, Can't Say Sl*t, is now streaming on Amazon (Comedy Dynamics). She hosted the long-running cult show Eat Pray F*ck at the Hollywood Improv with frequent headliners Tom Papa and Margaret Cho. Her solo show, Gaslighting is My Love Language premiered at Edinburgh Fringe and was featured in the UK Times. It won 'best comedy" in the United Solo Festival in NYC. She is also an LA based playwright and her plays have been workshopped/produced at Naked Angels, NY Stage & Film, Comedy Central Stage, Skylight, and Circle X Theatre
