= List of awards and nominations received by BoJack Horseman =

BoJack Horseman awards and nominations
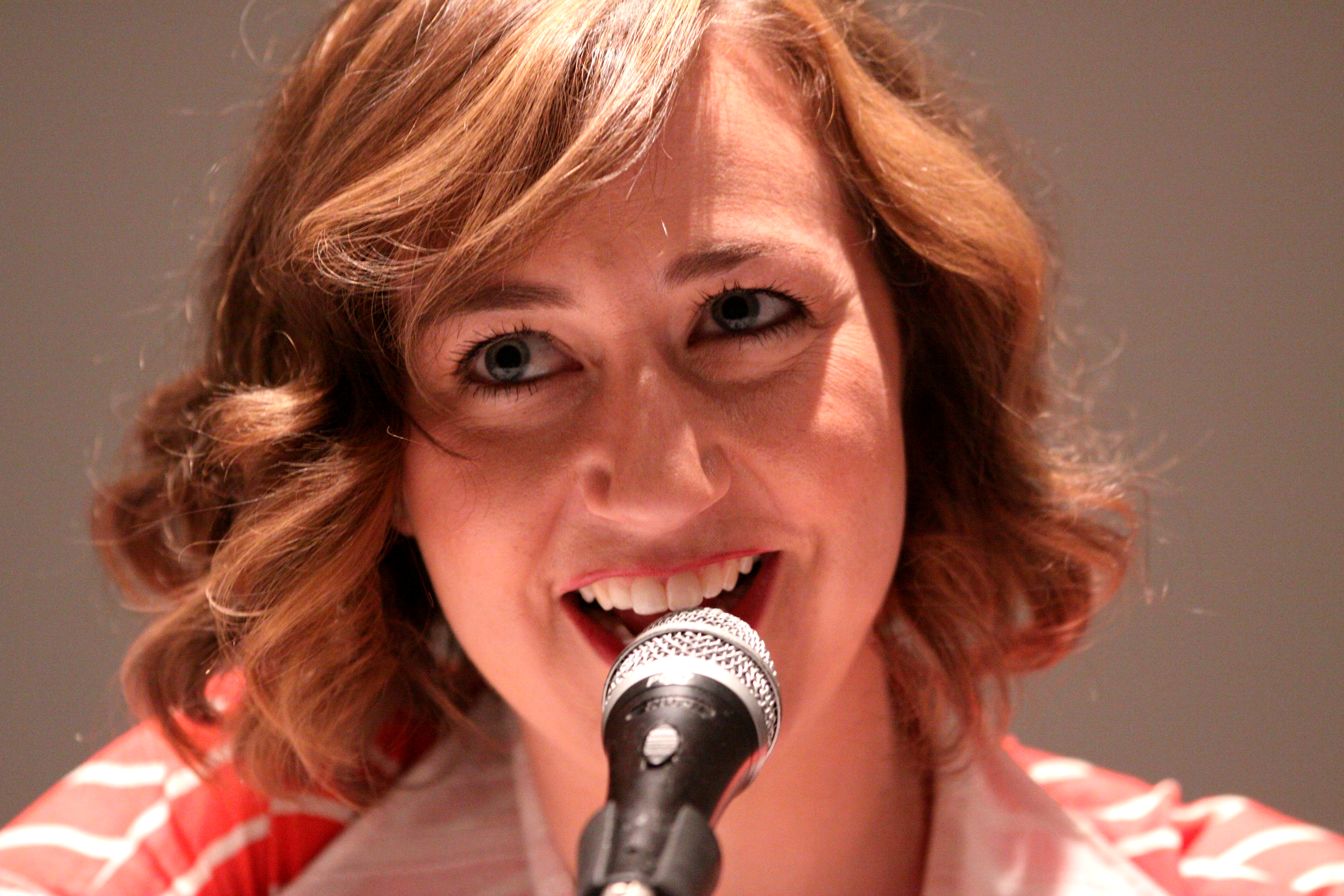
- Kristen Schaal's portrayal of Sarah Lynn in the episode "That's Too Much, Man!" earned her a nomination for the Primetime Emmy Award for Outstanding Character Voice-Over Performance.
Awards and nominations
Award	Wins	Nominations
AIAFF Awards	1	1
Annie Awards	3	11
Artios Awards	1	4
Creative Arts Emmy Awards	0	3
Critics' Choice Super Awards	2	3
Critics' Choice Television Awards	4	5
Eddie Awards	0	1
Golden Reel Awards	0	1
Golden Trailer Awards	1	2
Hollywood Music in Media Awards	0	1
NAACP Image Awards	0	1
Saturn Awards	0	3
Writers Guild of America Awards	3	7

Totals (Note: Certain award groups do not simply award one winner. They acknowledge several different recipients, have runners-up, and have third place. Since this is a specific recognition and is different from losing an award, runner-up mentions are considered wins in this award tally. For simplification and to avoid errors, each award in this list has been presumed to have had a prior nomination.)
- Wins: 15
- Nominations: 43

BoJack Horseman is an American adult animated tragicomedy created by Raphael Bob-Waksberg. Presented as a sitcom set primarily in Los Angeles, the series tells the story of the eponymous anthropomorphic horse (voiced by Will Arnett), who is a washed-up star of a 1990s sitcom who plans his return to celebrity relevance with an autobiography to be written by human ghostwriter Diane Nguyen (Alison Brie). He also has to contend with his cat agent Princess Carolyn (Amy Sedaris), human roommate Todd Chavez (Aaron Paul), and former dog rival Mr. Peanutbutter (Paul F. Tompkins), as well as his struggles with depression and addiction. The series premiered on Netflix on August 22, 2014, and concluded on January 31, 2020, after six seasons and 77 episodes.

Despite mixed reviews upon its debut, critics were significantly more positive towards the second half of the first season, and the subsequent seasons received widespread critical acclaim. (Note: Season-by-season reception: Season 1 holds a 69% approval rating based on 26 reviews on Rotten Tomatoes and a score of 59 based on 13 reviews on Metacritic.; Season 2 holds a 100% approval rating based on 22 reviews on Rotten Tomatoes and a score of 90 based on 7 reviews on Metacritic.; Season 3 holds a 100% approval rating based on 31 reviews on Rotten Tomatoes and a score of 89 based on 12 reviews on Metacritic.; Season 4 holds a 97% approval rating based on 35 reviews on Rotten Tomatoes and a score of 87 based on 5 reviews on Metacritic.; Season 5 holds a 98% approval rating based on 47 reviews on Rotten Tomatoes and a score of 92 based on 6 reviews on Metacritic.; Season 6 holds a 96% approval rating based on 52 reviews on Rotten Tomatoes and a score of 93 based on 6 reviews on Metacritic.) GQ hailed the show as one of the best of the decade, and IndieWire ranked BoJack Horseman as the greatest animated TV show of all time. The show has been lauded for its realistic take on depression, trauma, addiction, self-destructive behavior, racism, sexism, sexuality, and the human condition.

Throughout its run, the series has received numerous accolades, including three Saturn Award nominations for Best Animated Series on Television, four Critics' Choice Television Awards for Best Animated Series, and two Creative Arts Emmy Award nominations for Outstanding Animated Program. For her portrayal of the human child actress Sarah Lynn in the episode "That's Too Much, Man!", where the character struggles with addiction and dies from an overdose, Kristen Schaal was nominated for the Primetime Emmy Award for Outstanding Character Voice-Over Performance. Additionally, writers on the show have received a total of seven nominations from the Writers Guild of America, three of which were won by Joe Lawson, Kate Purdy, and Nick Adams.

== Awards and nominations ==
Awards and nominations received by BoJack Horseman
Award	Year (Note: The listed year refers to the date of the ceremony, not necessarily the year in which the corresponding season or episode aired.)	Category	Nominee(s)	Result	Ref.
AIAFF Awards	2017	Special Distinction for a TV Series	BoJack Horseman (for "Fish Out of Water")	Won	
Annie Awards	2016	Best General Audience Animated TV/Broadcast Production	BoJack Horseman (for "Brand New Couch")	Nominated	
Annie Awards	2017	Best General Audience Animated TV/Broadcast Production	BoJack Horseman (for "Fish Out of Water")	Nominated	
Annie Awards	2017	Outstanding Achievement, Voice Acting in an Animated TV/Broadcast Production	Alison Brie	Nominated	
Annie Awards	2018	Best General Audience Animated Television/Broadcast Production	BoJack Horseman (for "Stupid Piece of Sh*t")	Nominated	
Annie Awards	2018	Outstanding Achievement for Voice Acting in an Animated Television/Broadcast Production	Wendie Malick (for "Time's Arrow")	Nominated	
Annie Awards	2018	Outstanding Achievement for Editorial in an Animated Television/Broadcast Production	José Martínez (for "Stupid Piece of Sh*t")	Nominated	
Annie Awards	2019	Best General Audience Animated Television/Broadcast Production	BoJack Horseman (for "The Dog Days are Over")	Won	
Annie Awards	2019	Outstanding Achievement for Voice Acting in an Animated Television/Broadcast Production	Will Arnett (for "Free Churro")	Won	
Annie Awards	2020	Best General Audience Animated Television/Broadcast Production	BoJack Horseman (for "The New Client")	Won	
Annie Awards	2020	Outstanding Achievement for Writing in an Animated Television/Broadcast Production	Alison Tafel (for "Feel-Good Story")	Nominated	
Annie Awards	2021	Outstanding Achievement for Character Animation in an Animated Television/Broadcast Production	James Bowman (for "Good Damage")	Nominated	
Artios Awards	2016	Outstanding Achievement in Casting – Television Animation	Linda Lamontagne	Nominated	
Artios Awards	2017	Outstanding Achievement in Casting – Television Animation	Linda Lamontagne	Nominated	
Artios Awards	2018	Outstanding Achievement in Casting – Television Animation	Linda Lamontagne	Won	
Artios Awards	2020	Outstanding Achievement in Casting – Television Animation	Linda Lamontagne	Nominated	
Creative Arts Emmy Awards	2017	Outstanding Character Voice-Over Performance	Kristen Schaal (for "That's Too Much, Man!")	Nominated	
Creative Arts Emmy Awards	2019	Outstanding Animated Program	BoJack Horseman (for "Free Churro")	Nominated	
Creative Arts Emmy Awards	2020	Outstanding Animated Program	BoJack Horseman (for "The View from Halfway Down")	Nominated	
Critics' Choice Super Awards	2021	Best Animated Series	BoJack Horseman	Won	
Critics' Choice Super Awards	2021	Best Voice Actor in an Animated Series	Will Arnett	Won	
Critics' Choice Super Awards	2021	Best Voice Actress in an Animated Series	Amy Sedaris	Nominated	
Critics' Choice Television Awards	2016	Best Animated Series	BoJack Horseman	Won	
Critics' Choice Television Awards	2016	Best Animated Series	BoJack Horseman	Won	
Critics' Choice Television Awards	2018	Best Animated Series	BoJack Horseman	Nominated	
Critics' Choice Television Awards	2019	Best Animated Series	BoJack Horseman	Won	
Critics' Choice Television Awards	2020	Best Animated Series	BoJack Horseman	Won	
Eddie Awards	2021	Best Edited Animation (Non-Theatrical)	Brian Swanson (for "Nice While It Lasted")	Nominated	
Golden Reel Awards	2017	TV Animation – Effects/Foley/Dialogue/ADR	BoJack Horseman (for "Fish Out of Water")	Nominated	
Golden Trailer Awards	2017	Best Animation/Family (TV Spot/Trailer/Teaser for a series)	BoJack Horseman (for season 3's "Trailer")	Nominated	
Golden Trailer Awards	2018	Best Animation/Family (TV Spot/Trailer/Teaser for a series)	BoJack Horseman (for season 4's "Missing")	Won	
Hollywood Music in Media Awards	2017	Original Score – TV Show/Limited Series	Jesse Novak	Nominated	
NAACP Image Awards	2019	Outstanding Character Voice-Over Performance	Issa Rae	Nominated	
Saturn Awards	2017	Best Animated Series on Television	BoJack Horseman	Nominated	
Saturn Awards	2018	Best Animated Series on Television	BoJack Horseman	Nominated	
Saturn Awards	2021	Best Animated Series on Television	BoJack Horseman	Nominated	
Writers Guild of America Awards	2016	Television: Animation	Kelly Galuska (for "Hank After Dark")	Nominated	
Writers Guild of America Awards	2017	Television: Animation	Elijah Aron and Jordan Young (for "Fish Out of Water")	Nominated	
Writers Guild of America Awards	2017	Television: Animation	Joe Lawson (for "Stop the Presses")	Won	
Writers Guild of America Awards	2018	Television: Animation	Joanna Calo (for "Ruthie")	Nominated	
Writers Guild of America Awards	2018	Television: Animation	Kate Purdy (for "Time's Arrow")	Won	
Writers Guild of America Awards	2020	Television: Animation	Elijah Aron (for "A Horse Walks Into a Rehab")	Nominated	
Writers Guild of America Awards	2021	Television: Animation	Nick Adams (for "Xerox of a Xerox")	Won	
