= List of BoJack Horseman episodes =

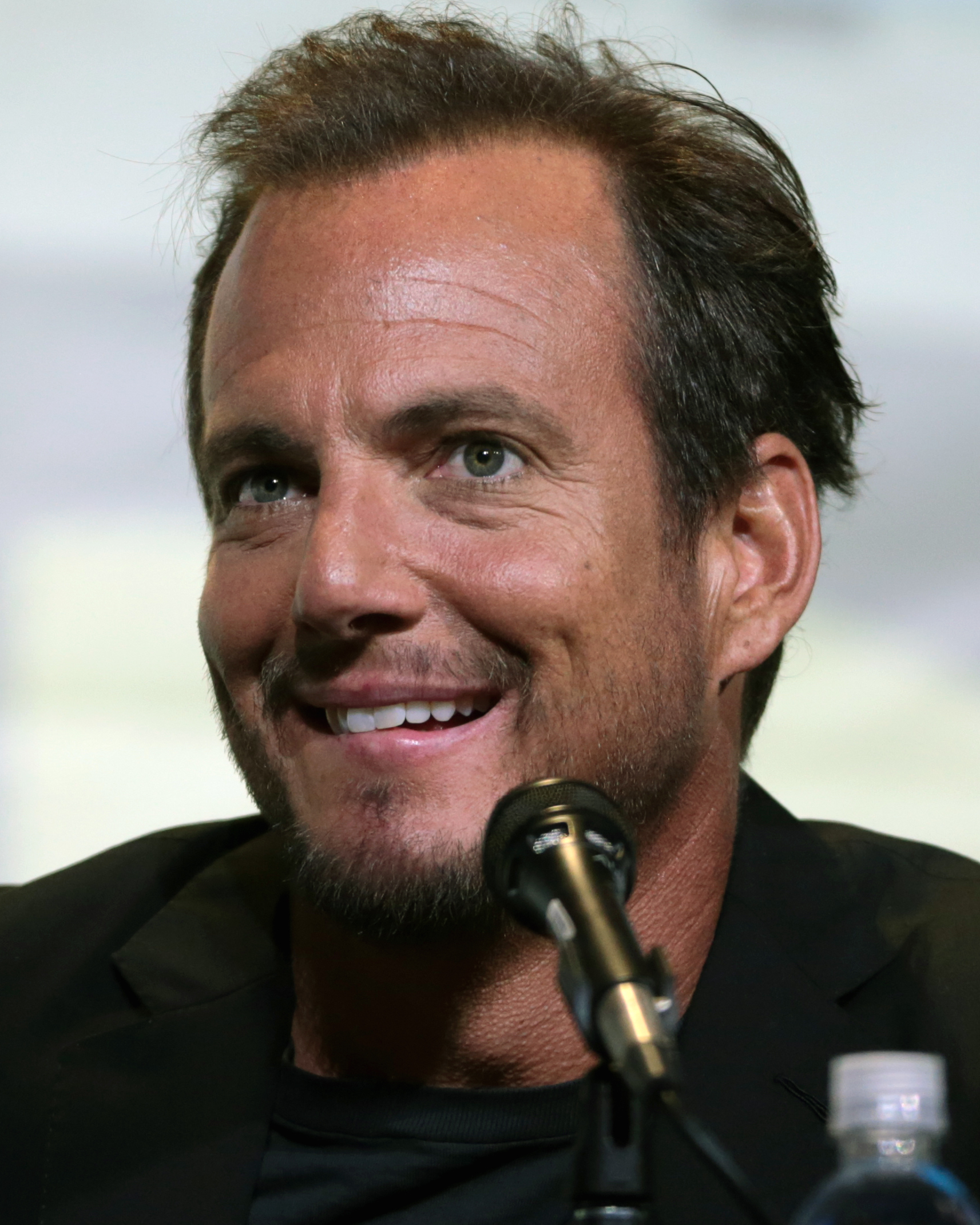
Series lead Will Arnett in 2016 at San Diego Comic-Con

BoJack Horseman is an American adult animated television series created by Raphael Bob-Waksberg. All six seasons were released through streaming on Netflix. The series, set in a world populated by both humans and anthropomorphic animals, stars Will Arnett as the eponymous character, BoJack Horseman, the now-irrelevant star of the 1990s sitcom Horsin' Around. The first season revolves around BoJack's planned return to relevance with an autobiography that he dictates to his ghostwriter, Diane Nguyen (Alison Brie); other individuals in BoJack's life include his agent Princess Carolyn (Amy Sedaris), his freeloading roommate Todd Chavez (Aaron Paul), and television star Mr. Peanutbutter (Paul F. Tompkins). The following seasons detail BoJack's life after returning to prominence. BoJack Horseman acts as a satire of the entertainment industry as a whole.

After coming up with the idea for the series in 2010, Bob-Waksberg successfully pitched BoJack Horseman to Netflix in late 2013. Netflix gave the series a release window of August 2014, which forced the entire first season to be created in only 35 weeks. The series was renewed for a sixth and final season in 2019, which Bob-Waksberg agreed would be a good ending point for the narrative. Over the course of six seasons, 76 episodes of BoJack Horseman were released between August 22, 2014, and January 31, 2020, including one standalone Christmas special.

Season one of BoJack Horseman was met with mixed reception from critics upon release, particularly due to its tonal shift from comedy to drama halfway through. It was seen as jarring, particularly since many early reviewers were only shown the first few episodes of the season. Despite this, each subsequent season received universal acclaim, according to the review aggregator website Rotten Tomatoes.

== Series overview ==
Season	Episodes		Originally released
1	12		August 22, 2014
Special			December 19, 2014
2	12		July 17, 2015
3	12		July 22, 2016
4	12		September 8, 2017
5	12		September 14, 2018
6	16	8	October 25, 2019
6	16	8	January 31, 2020

== Episodes ==
=== Season 1 (2014) ===
BoJack Horseman season 1 episodes
No. overall	No. in season	Title	Directed by	Written by	Original release date	Prod. code
1	1	"BoJack Horseman: The BoJack Horseman Story, Chapter One"	Joel Moser	Raphael Bob-Waksberg	August 22, 2014	101
2	2	"BoJack Hates the Troops"	J.C. Gonzalez	Raphael Bob-Waksberg	August 22, 2014	102
3	3	"Prickly-Muffin"	Martin Cendreda	Raphael Bob-Waksberg	August 22, 2014	103
4	4	"Zoës and Zeldas"	Amy Winfrey	Peter A. Knight	August 22, 2014	104
5	5	"Live Fast, Diane Nguyen"	Joel Moser	Caroline Williams	August 22, 2014	105
6	6	"Our A-Story is a 'D' Story"	J.C. Gonzalez	Scott Marder	August 22, 2014	106
7	7	"Say Anything"	Martin Cendreda	Joe Lawson	August 22, 2014	107
8	8	"The Telescope"	Amy Winfrey	Mehar Sethi	August 22, 2014	108
9	9	"Horse Majeure"	Joel Moser	Peter A. Knight	August 22, 2014	109
10	10	"One Trick Pony"	J.C. Gonzalez	Laura Gutin Peterson	August 22, 2014	110
11	11	"Downer Ending"	Amy Winfrey	Kate Purdy	August 22, 2014	111
12	12	"Later"	Martin Cendreda	Raphael Bob-Waksberg	August 22, 2014	112

=== Special (2014) ===
To appease fans waiting for the release of season two, Netflix released "Sabrina's Christmas Wish", an in-universe Christmas special of Horsin’ Around, the fictional television series in which BoJack had previously starred.

No. overall	Title	Directed by	Written by	Original release date	Prod. code
13	"Sabrina's Christmas Wish"	J.C. Gonzalez	Raphael Bob-Waksberg	December 19, 2014	200
BoJack and Todd watch a Christmas episode of Horsin' Around titled "Sabrina's Christmas Wish". In the episode, BoJack's youngest adopted daughter, Sabrina, upon discovering Santa's existence, decides to wish for her parents to be alive again. When the ending brings much confusion to Todd, an initially skeptical BoJack suggests they watch the series' eight other Christmas specials.

=== Season 2 (2015) ===
BoJack Horseman season 2 episodes
No. overall	No. in season	Title	Directed by	Written by	Original release date	Prod. code
14	1	"Brand New Couch"	Amy Winfrey	Raphael Bob-Waksberg	July 17, 2015	201
15	2	"Yesterdayland"	J.C. Gonzalez	Peter A. Knight	July 17, 2015	202
16	3	"Still Broken"	Amy Winfrey	Mehar Sethi	July 17, 2015	203
17	4	"After the Party"	J.C. Gonzalez	Joe Lawson	July 17, 2015	204
18	5	"Chickens"	Mike Roberts	Joanna Calo	July 17, 2015	205
19	6	"Higher Love"	J.C. Gonzalez	Vera Santamaria	July 17, 2015	206
20	7	"Hank After Dark"	Amy Winfrey	Kelly Galuska	July 17, 2015	207
21	8	"Let's Find Out"	Matt Mariska	Alison Flierl & Scott Chernoff	July 17, 2015	208
22	9	"The Shot"	Matt Mariska	Elijah Aron & Jordan Young	July 17, 2015	209
23	10	"Yes And"	J.C. Gonzalez	Mehar Sethi	July 17, 2015	210
24	11	"Escape from L.A."	Amy Winfrey	Joe Lawson	July 17, 2015	211
25	12	"Out to Sea"	Mike Roberts	Elijah Aron & Jordan Young	July 17, 2015	212

=== Season 3 (2016) ===
BoJack Horseman season 3 episodes
No. overall	No. in season	Title	Directed by	Written by	Original release date	Prod. code
26	1	"Start Spreading the News"	J.C. Gonzalez	Joe Lawson	July 22, 2016	301
27	2	"The BoJack Horseman Show"	Adam Parton	Vera Santamaria	July 22, 2016	302
28	3	"BoJack Kills"	Amy Winfrey	Kelly Galuska	July 22, 2016	303
29	4	"Fish Out of Water"	Mike Hollingsworth	Elijah Aron & Jordan Young	July 22, 2016	304
30	5	"Love and/or Marriage"	J.C. Gonzalez	Peter A. Knight	July 22, 2016	305
31	6	"Brrap Brrap Pew Pew"	Amy Winfrey	Joanna Calo	July 22, 2016	306
32	7	"Stop the Presses"	Adam Parton	Joe Lawson	July 22, 2016	307
33	8	"Old Acquaintance"	J.C. Gonzalez	Alison Flierl & Scott Chernoff	July 22, 2016	308
34	9	"Best Thing That Ever Happened"	Amy Winfrey	Kate Purdy	July 22, 2016	309
35	10	"It's You"	Adam Parton	Vera Santamaria	July 22, 2016	310
36	11	"That's Too Much, Man!"	J.C. Gonzalez	Elijah Aron & Jordan Young	July 22, 2016	311
37	12	"That Went Well"	Amy Winfrey	Raphael Bob-Waksberg	July 22, 2016	312

=== Season 4 (2017) ===
BoJack Horseman season 4 episodes
No. overall	No. in season	Title	Directed by	Written by	Original release date	Prod. code
38	1	"See Mr. Peanutbutter Run"	Amy Winfrey	Peter A. Knight	September 8, 2017	401
39	2	"The Old Sugarman Place"	Anne Walker Farrell	Kate Purdy	September 8, 2017	402
40	3	"Hooray! Todd Episode!"	Aaron Long	Elijah Aron & Jordan Young	September 8, 2017	403
41	4	"Commence Fracking"	Matt Garofalo	Joanna Calo	September 8, 2017	404
42	5	"Thoughts and Prayers"	Amy Winfrey	Nick Adams	September 8, 2017	405
43	6	"Stupid Piece of Sh*t"	Anne Walker Farrell	Alison Tafel	September 8, 2017	406
44	7	"Underground"	Aaron Long	Kelly Galuska	September 8, 2017	407
45	8	"The Judge"	Otto Murga	Elijah Aron & Jordan Young	September 8, 2017	408
46	9	"Ruthie"	Amy Winfrey	Joanna Calo	September 8, 2017	409
47	10	"lovin that cali lifestyle!!"	Anne Walker Farrell	Peter A. Knight	September 8, 2017	410
48	11	"Time's Arrow"	Aaron Long	Kate Purdy	September 8, 2017	411
49	12	"What Time Is It Right Now"	Tim Rauch	Raphael Bob-Waksberg	September 8, 2017	412

=== Season 5 (2018) ===
BoJack Horseman season 5 episodes
No. overall	No. in season	Title	Directed by	Written by	Original release date	Prod. code
50	1	"The Light Bulb Scene"	Adam Parton	Kate Purdy	September 14, 2018	501
51	2	"The Dog Days Are Over"	Amy Winfrey	Joanna Calo	September 14, 2018	502
52	3	"Planned Obsolescence"	Aaron Long	Elijah Aron	September 14, 2018	503
53	4	"BoJack the Feminist"	Anne Walker Farrell	Nick Adams	September 14, 2018	504
54	5	"The Amelia Earhart Story"	Adam Parton	Joe Lawson	September 14, 2018	505
55	6	"Free Churro"	Amy Winfrey	Raphael Bob-Waksberg	September 14, 2018	506
56	7	"INT. SUB"	Aaron Long	Alison Tafel	September 14, 2018	507
57	8	"Mr. Peanutbutter's Boos"	Anne Walker Farrell	Kelly Galuska	September 14, 2018	508
58	9	"Ancient History"	Peter Merryman	Rachel Kaplan	September 14, 2018	509
59	10	"Head in the Clouds"	Amy Winfrey	Peter A. Knight	September 14, 2018	510
60	11	"The Showstopper"	Aaron Long	Elijah Aron	September 14, 2018	511
61	12	"The Stopped Show"	Anne Walker Farrell	Joanna Calo	September 14, 2018	512

=== Season 6 (2019–20) ===
The sixth and final season was released in two parts; part one was released on October 25, 2019, and part two on January 31, 2020.

BoJack Horseman season 6 episodes
No. overall	No. in season	Title	Directed by	Written by	Original release date	Prod. code
62	1	"A Horse Walks into a Rehab"	Peter Merryman	Elijah Aron	October 25, 2019	601
63	2	"The New Client"	Amy Winfrey	Nick Adams	October 25, 2019	602
64	3	"Feel-Good Story"	Mollie Helms	Alison Tafel	October 25, 2019	603
65	4	"Surprise!"	Adam Parton	Peter A. Knight	October 25, 2019	604
66	5	"A Little Uneven, Is All"	Peter Merryman	Rachel Kaplan	October 25, 2019	605
67	6	"The Kidney Stays in the Picture"	Mollie Helms	Minhal Baig	October 25, 2019	606
68	7	"The Face of Depression"	Aaron Long	Shauna McGarry	October 25, 2019	607
69	8	"A Quick One, While He's Away"	Amy Winfrey	Raphael Bob-Waksberg	October 25, 2019	608
70	9	"Intermediate Scene Study w/ BoJack Horseman"	Adam Parton	Joe Lawson	January 31, 2020	609
71	10	"Good Damage"	James Bowman	Joanna Calo	January 31, 2020	610
72	11	"Sunk Cost and All That"	Amy Winfrey	Jonny Sun	January 31, 2020	611
73	12	"Xerox of a Xerox"	Aaron Long	Nick Adams	January 31, 2020	612
74	13	"The Horny Unicorn"	Adam Parton	Amy Schwartz	January 31, 2020	613
75	14	"Angela"	James Bowman	Shauna McGarry	January 31, 2020	614
76	15	"The View from Halfway Down"	Amy Winfrey	Alison Tafel	January 31, 2020	615
77	16	"Nice While It Lasted"	Aaron Long	Raphael Bob-Waksberg	January 31, 2020	616
