= BoJack Horseman season 6 =

Season of television series

BoJack Horseman
- Season 6
- Season 6 promotional posters
- Starring: Will Arnett; Amy Sedaris; Alison Brie; Paul F. Tompkins; Aaron Paul
- No. of episodes: 16

Release
- Original network: Netflix
- Original release: October 25, 2019 – January 31, 2020

Season chronology
- ← Previous; Season 5

The sixth and final season of Netflix's animated comedy-drama television series BoJack Horseman. Unlike the five previous seasons that had 12 episodes each, season 6 consists of 16 episodes and is divided into two parts of eight episodes each. The first part was entirely released into Netflix's streaming service on October 25, 2019. The second part was released on January 31, 2020.

== Cast and characters ==
=== Main ===
- Will Arnett as BoJack Horseman, Butterscotch Horseman, and Secretariat
- Amy Sedaris as Princess Carolyn and Sharona
- Alison Brie as Diane Nguyen
- Paul F. Tompkins as Mr. Peanutbutter
- Aaron Paul as Todd Chavez

=== Recurring ===
- Daniele Gaither as Carol Himmelfarb-Richardson, Biscuits Braxby, and Sextina Aquafina
- Cedric Yarbrough as Officer Meow-Meow Fuzzyface
- Sam Richardson as Dr. Champ
- Stanley Tucci as Herb Kazzaz
- Kristen Schaal as Sarah Lynn
- Julia Chan as Pickles Aplenty
- Patton Oswalt as Pinky Penguin
- Lakeith Stanfield as Guy
- Diedrich Bader as Judah Mannowdog
- Jaime Camil as Jorge Chavez
- Aparna Nancherla as Hollyhock Manheim-Mannheim-Guerrero-Robinson-Zilberschlag-Hsung-Fonzerelli-McQuack
- Hilary Swank as Joey Pogo
- Echo Gillette as Maude
- Margo Martindale as Esteemed Character Actress Margo Martindale
- Paget Brewster as Intrepid Gal Reporter Paige Sinclair
- Max Greenfield as Maximillian Banks
- Geraldine Viswanathan as Tawnie
- Olivia Wilde as Charlotte Carson
- Bobby Cannavale as Vance Waggoner

=== Guest ===
- Lee Daniels as Flea Daniels
- Raphael Bob-Waksberg as Charley Witherspoon and Sarah Lynn's Stepfather
- Adam Conover as A Ryan Seacrest Type, Paparazzi Blue Jay, and Bradley Hitler-Smith
- Dave Segal as Paparazzi Robin
- Cindy Crawford as Cindy Crawfish
- Marcia Gay Harden as Denise and McCaitlyn
- Kristin Chenoweth as Vanessa Gekko
- John Witherspoon as Franco Aplenty
- Zehra Fazal as Demi Aplenty, Ilana Smith, and Ilana Benson
- Stephen Root as Jeremiah Whitewhale
- "Weird Al" Yankovic as Captain Peanutbutter
- Lana Condor as Casey McGarry
- Phoebe Robinson as Dean Squooshyface
- J.K. Simmons as Lenny Turteltaub and Horse Priest
- Maria Bamford as Kelsey Jannings
- Stephanie Beatriz as Gina Cazador
- Ben Schwartz as Rutabaga Rabitowitz
- Jermaine Fowler as Peter Pocket
- Kiersey Clemons as Jameson
- Tim Meadows as Jameson's Dad
- Samantha Bee as herself
- Ilana Glazer as Penny Carson
- David Chang as Elefino Customer
- Anjelica Huston as Angela Diaz
- Nicole Holofcener as herself
- Wendie Malick as Beatrice Horseman
- Lin-Manuel Miranda as Crackerjack Sugarman
- Zach Braff as Famous Actor Zach Braff
- Brandon T. Jackson as Corduroy Jackson Jackson
- Tom Kenny
- Cree Summer

== Episodes ==
BoJack Horseman season 6 episodes
| No. overall | No. in season | Title | Directed by | Written by | Original release date | Prod. code |
|---|---|---|---|---|---|---|
Part 1
| 62 | 1 | "A Horse Walks into a Rehab" | Peter Merryman | Elijah Aron | October 25, 2019 | 601 |
BoJack initially struggles with rehab, but finds the motivation to excel when he learns that Sarah Lynn once was a patient in the same clinic. He accidentally helps teenage patient Jameson sneak out to go to a party and follows her out of guilt, eventually finding her at her father's house, who she claims neglects her in favor of his new child. As BoJack helps her smash up the house, her father arrives and she tries to blame it on BoJack. Her father sees through the ruse and explains that the baby is actually Jameson's, taking them both back to rehab. BoJack catches Jameson trying to sneak a water bottle full of vodka in and takes it from her. Throughout the episode, a series of flashbacks are shown in reverse chronological order, all of them involving BoJack and alcohol, revealing that the first time he drank was as a young child following a house party thrown by his parents.
| 63 | 2 | "The New Client" | Amy Winfrey | Nick Adams | October 25, 2019 | 602 |
Princess Carolyn's still unnamed baby cries constantly, depriving of her sleep and making her more sluggish in day-to-day life. She orders a re-edit of Mr. Peanutbutter's movie Birthday Dad when questioned on how feminist her works are, which cuts it down to forty minutes and gets the movie cancelled. Todd, watching the baby, accidentally orders a TV show under its name, which Princess Carolyn realizes is the perfect opportunity to pitch Birthday Dad as a television show. She has an earnest talk with Vanessa Gekko and confides that she is afraid she may not properly love her daughter, but Gekko assures her that she just needs to keep going regardless and that it will come naturally. Princess Carolyn finally gets the baby to sleep, and decides that she will name her "Ruthie".
| 64 | 3 | "Feel-Good Story" | Mollie Helms | Alison Tafel | October 25, 2019 | 603 |
Diane travels the country filming journalistic videos with her bison cameraman Guy, who she begins to develop an intimate relationship with. Their boss asking them to find more "feel-good stories" in Guy's hometown of Chicago leads them to uncover a conspiracy involving massive conglomerate Whitewhale, but their company is bought out by it and the story is not enough to expose them. Diane and Guy argue when he is unable to introduce her as anything more than his coworker, and she leaves Chicago for Los Angeles after she tells him he cannot be the only good thing in her life. She returns home to find several letters from BoJack written in rehab, where he laments wasting years being depressed when he could have been happy, inspiring her to call Guy and offer to stay with him in Chicago.
| 65 | 4 | "Surprise!" | Adam Parton | Peter A. Knight | October 25, 2019 | 604 |
Mr. Peanutbutter and Pickles Aplenty's friends set up a surprise party at their house to celebrate their upcoming marriage, only for him to reveal that he cheated on her (Note: As depicted in "Head in the Clouds" and "The Stopped Show".) just as they get home, forcing the guests to stay hidden. As they argue, Princess Carolyn loses Ruthie and Todd finds her, inspiring her to hire him as a nanny. Diane tells BoJack that she is moving to Chicago, and he promises that he will be fine without her when she asks. Pickles is devastated by the news, even more so when she learns that Mr. Peanutbutter cheated with Diane. Unable to decide what to do, she settles on forgiving him on the condition that she gets to sleep with someone else as comeuppance.
| 66 | 5 | "A Little Uneven, Is All" | Peter Merryman | Rachel Kaplan | October 25, 2019 | 605 |
In a flashback, Sarah Lynn accidentally drinks vodka on the set of Horsin' Around, and BoJack blames hairstylist Sharona despite not knowing whose alcohol she drank. In the present, rehab therapy horse Doctor Champ proclaims BoJack ready to leave after six months, but an angry BoJack tries to stay after learning they are just clearing him out to make room for celebrity Joey Pogo. Ruthie takes up all of Todd's time, so he hires several assistants to do his jobs for him, one of which visits BoJack in rehab, where he reveals he held onto Jameson's vodka because it reminded him of the incident with Sarah Lynn. As he unintentionally inspires the assistant to start an uprising, he throws the bottle away, only for it to end up in Doctor Champ's hands and ruin his sobriety. Mr. Peanutbutter's infidelity is made public, but Princess Carolyn wins him the public's love back by pushing him in front of a car and claiming it was a suicide attempt. Diane calls Princess Carolyn and gets a deal to write her book of essays in six months, but struggles to start.
| 67 | 6 | "The Kidney Stays in the Picture" | Mollie Helms | Minhal Baig | October 25, 2019 | 606 |
Todd's stepfather Jorge visits to inform him that his estranged mother Helen needs a kidney, but Todd has already sold his to Whitewhale. They travel to Chicago and break into the center with Diane's help, retrieving the kidney while Jorge reveals to Todd that it was Helen who kicked Todd out when he was younger, not himself. Hollywoo falls into chaos with all the assistants on strike, and Princess Carolyn and Lenny Turtletaub shut it down by promoting the leaders and destroying the union. However, Princess Carolyn remembers her life as an assistant and decides to actually make a difference, enlisting the aid of Judah Mannowdog to help the assistants. BoJack leaves rehab but finds Doctor Champ at a bar, where he points out that BoJack has no horses in his life except Hollyhock because they all remind him of his parents, and BoJack checks him into another rehab facility when he continues to drink. Doctor Champ, blaming BoJack for his loss of sobriety, bitterly warns him that he destroys anyone who cares about him and wants him to remember the damage he's caused. Bojack, now sober, accepts his past mistakes and BoJack decides to finally go home.
| 68 | 7 | "The Face of Depression" | Aaron Long | Shauna McGarry | October 25, 2019 | 607 |
Mr. Peanutbutter goes on tour with Joey Pogo as America's "face of depression" to spread awareness. Uncomfortable in his house, BoJack flies to Chicago to thank a depressed Diane for never giving up on him, and sees that Guy's house is a mess with him gone for a job, encouraging her to follow Guy's advice and take antidepressants. He goes to Wesleyan to see Hollyhock, where he learns that a job as a drama teacher is open. Returning to Los Angeles, he asks Princess Carolyn to give him a reference for the job while encouraging her to take time off and spend it with Ruthie. Attending an Alcoholics Anonymous meeting, he bumps into Sharona, who he apologizes to in earnest and is forgiven. She cuts his hair short, revealing he has been dyeing it black for some time, and he chooses to wear it in its natural gray. He learns that he got the job, informing rabbit airport Cinnabon worker Maude of Emily's dating app (Note: As depicted in "Ancient History".) when he realizes she is asexual, and she matches with Todd. BoJack stops in D.C. and encounters Mr. Peanutbutter, deciding to finally give him a reenactment of a crossover episode between Horsin' Around and his show. Princess Carolyn hires Judah to be her company's COO, while Diane starts taking her medication and gains weight upon Guy's return, which he is happy about. BoJack visits an Old English horse village tourist attraction, where he attends a church service and seems to find peace in what the preacher spoke about.
| 69 | 8 | "A Quick One, While He's Away" | Amy Winfrey | Raphael Bob-Waksberg | October 25, 2019 | 608 |
Margo Martindale, now a devoted nun, asks if she can truly be forgiven for her sins and steals the monsignor's car when she gets no solid answer. After being fired from Secretariat, Kelsey Jannings struggles to find work as a director but is tapped by her agent Rutabaga Rabitowitz to direct a female superhero movie. Put off by the banal, by-the-numbers pitch, she counters with her own pitch, which gets her the job. Gina Cazador, filming a new movie, panics on set when her costar puts his hand on her neck (Note: A reference to "The Showstopper", where she was strangled by BoJack.) and storms out in the middle of shooting. The director of the film almost recommends Gina for the lead in Kelsey's movie, but finds her to be "difficult" and instead posits Courtney Portnoy. Reporters Maximillian Banks and pig Paige Sinclair investigate Sarah Lynn's death, (Note: As depicted in "That's Too Much, Man!".) realizing somebody was with her in a voicemail she left for her mother beforehand. They investigate her AA meeting place, where one member recalls BoJack telling a story about Penny Carson, leading them to drive to New Mexico. Hollyhock goes to a party in New York City, where she has an anxiety attack while watching drunk people losing control of their bodies (Note: A reference to "lovin that cali lifestyle!!", where Hollyhock accidentally overdosed on weight loss pills.) until a partygoer notices and takes her outside for air. He tells her a story about a famous actor taking him and his friends to prom and his girlfriend getting alcohol poisoning, (Note: As depicted in "Escape from L.A.".) revealing him to be a friend of Penny's. Hollyhock asks who the actor is, but Peter seems hesitant to tell her. She asks again and the episode cuts to black before Peter can reply. Note: Aside from the title sequence, none of the main characters appear in this episode. BoJack is only indirectly mentioned by both Sarah Lynn and Peter, the partygoer.
Part 2
| 70 | 9 | "Intermediate Scene Study w/ BoJack Horseman" | Adam Parton | Joe Lawson | January 31, 2020 | 609 |
BoJack sells his restaurant and Mr. Peanutbutter buys it. BoJack begins teaching, but finds his students to be below average and tries his best to encourage them, despite the fact that some of them start to show up to his AA meetings in character in an attempt to impress him. He attempts to get involved in Hollyhock's love of rugby, which only puts her off it. She does not show up on the night of his students' acting showcase and he confronts her, and she admits she feels uncomfortable with how he moved in without asking and tried to get involved in her interests. BoJack returns to the showcase and gets a call from Charlotte Carson just as it ends, who claims reporters are talking to Penny and demands for him to figure out what is happening, causing him to have an anxiety attack.
| 71 | 10 | "Good Damage" | James Bowman | Joanna Calo | January 31, 2020 | 610 |
Diane finds herself struggling to write about her personal traumas while on antidepressants, unintentionally starting a girl detective book based on a mall worker she met. She goes off her medication in an attempt to write better, but she only has a breakdown, forcing Guy to send the detective story to Princess Carolyn so Diane does not miss her deadline. Princess Carolyn loves the book, and after a conversation with her, Diane decides she would rather continue writing it. Sinclair and Banks track down Penny and try to ask her about BoJack, but Charlotte steps in, wanting Penny to take time to think about talking to them. She calls BoJack, and Todd finds him collapsed after the call.
| 72 | 11 | "Sunk Cost and All That" | Amy Winfrey | Jonny Sun | January 31, 2020 | 611 |
Mr. Peanutbutter, Pickles, and Joey open the new restaurant and attempt to run it together, with Pickles and Joey disliking each other despite Mr. Peanutbutter attempting to get them to sleep together. They do, and discover they have feelings for each other as Pickles leaves with Joey for his upcoming tour. Sinclair and Banks ask Mr. Peanutbutter about seeing BoJack at his house during his bender with Sarah Lynn, which he confirms, as well as unintentionally revealing that he and Sarah Lynn had heroin with them. BoJack, Diane, Princess Carolyn, and Todd hole up in his office to determine what the story being run on him is, which they discover is Sarah Lynn when Sinclair calls Diane. BoJack expresses anger at being grilled after he has changed for the better, causing Todd to leave after seeing the "old Bojack" return, and while Princess Carolyn plans to help him beat the story, Diane insists he should be honest and leaves in disgust when he lies to Sinclair on the phone. He asks Princess Carolyn why she is helping him after everything, and she says it is because she has loved him longer than she has loved anyone else.
| 73 | 12 | "Xerox of a Xerox" | Aaron Long | Nick Adams | January 31, 2020 | 612 |
BoJack does an interview with Biscuits Braxby about Sarah Lynn after Sinclair's story releases, and wins the public's love back as Biscuits softballs him. Confident, he agrees to do a second interview to boost the network's ratings, before which Biscuits talks to Sinclair and Doctor Champ, the latter of whom divulges BoJack's secrets out of spite. During the second interview, she reveals that BoJack waited seventeen minutes to call an ambulance after Sarah Lynn overdosed, and points out his disturbing pattern of abusing his power over young, impressionable women. Princess Carolyn chooses not to watch the interview, as does Todd, now dating Maude, who asks him to get an apartment with her. Diane meets Guy's son Sonny, who she chafes with, and watches the interview, disturbed by what she sees. While BoJack waits for the public backlash from the interview to air, he goes to a comedy club where he performed standup after Herb Kazzaz invited him to do a screen test for Horsin' Around and does a routine.
| 74 | 13 | "The Horny Unicorn" | Adam Parton | Amy Schwartz | January 31, 2020 | 613 |
A few months after the second interview airs, BoJack is nationally hated, has been fired from Wesleyan, and Hollyhock is not returning his calls. His accountant sells his house to pay off a lawsuit, forcing him to move in with Mr. Peanutbutter, and he receives a letter from Hollyhock that he is too afraid to open. Vance Waggoner offers BoJack his support after he is forced to take a job as an extra on Birthday Dad and BoJack accepts, the two of them coming up with an anti-PC "Horny Unicorn" character for BoJack to play in a movie. Waggoner takes him to EWESC to berate his estranged daughter, where BoJack is accepted by a misogynistic fraternity that invites him to a party. BoJack decides to open Hollyhock's letter, and the unseen contents make him drop it on the ground and sit in silence in the middle of the party as someone places a drink in his hand. Todd invites Jorge and Helen to a housewarming party at his new apartment and puts together a crew of actors to make the party look populated, but Helen does not show up. After the completion of Diane's book, Sonny reads it and offers her positive notes.
| 75 | 14 | "Angela" | James Bowman | Shauna McGarry | January 31, 2020 | 614 |
Todd and Maude have dinner with Jorge, but Helen, wracked with guilt over kicking him out, refuses to join them. Hurt, Todd has Martindale stage a hostage situation so he gets the chance to see her again, but she ends up having an anxiety attack and they reconnect in the hospital. As Guy asks Diane to move to Houston with him, she calls Mr. Peanutbutter after learning he has written a memoir. He apologizes for the ways he was thoughtless in their marriage and affirms that he is glad they were in each other's lives, as they helped each other become who they are. Princess Carolyn gets an offer from Turtletaub to operate a new wing of his agency while she learns that Judah is playing a show with his band, which she attends but finds he did not show up. She finds him at the office doing work and he encourages her to forge her own path instead of working under Turtletaub, and confesses his love for her through a song he was supposed to play. BoJack, having ended his sobriety, gets a call from Angela Diaz, the former president of ABC and the woman who fired Herb, (Note: As depicted in "The Telescope".) and he goes to her house to find that she had a Horsin' Around Blu-ray produced. She explains that she wants BoJack to authorize a re-edit of Horsin' Around in which he is not present and she reveals after he signs a contract that he could have kept Herb on the show, to his fury. He steals her car and a Blu-ray, and gets drunk as he drives to his old house. He breaks in and watches the Horsin' Around screen test while continuing to drink.
| 76 | 15 | "The View from Halfway Down" | Amy Winfrey | Alison Tafel | January 31, 2020 | 615 |
BoJack awakens in a recurring dream of his, where he goes to a dinner party at Beatrice's house and eats with other dead people, including Herb, Sarah Lynn, Crackerjack Sugarman, and Butterscotch Horseman in Secretariat's body. They discuss the best and worst parts of their life before going into a theatre, at which point BoJack claims his dream usually ends, but it continues. As the attendees all perform acts that relate to their lives before being sucked into a black doorway, Butterscotch pulls him aside for a smoke and expresses his regrets about their relationship, before revealing BoJack is, in reality, drowning in his old pool. As the rest of the attendees vanish into the doorway, black tar emerges from it and starts to chase BoJack through the house. Remembering that he called Diane before the dream started, he assumes that he cannot be dying, and so he tries to call her again. She points out that nothing that is happening is real and she never picked up the phone, and so he accepts his fate of the black tar engulfing him as he asks how her day was.
| 77 | 16 | "Nice While It Lasted" | Aaron Long | Raphael Bob-Waksberg | January 31, 2020 | 616 |
BoJack's career ended after he is found by the new owners of his old house and sentenced to fourteen months in prison for breaking and entering, where he begins staging theatrical productions with the inmates. He is allowed one day of release for Princess Carolyn and Judah's wedding, and is taken by Mr. Peanutbutter, who finally replaces the "D" on the Hollywood Sign (Note: A reference to "Our A-Story is a 'D' Story", where BoJack stole the D from the sign.) but accidentally replaces it with a "B". He reveals to BoJack that he has been going to therapy and has broken his cycle of forcing himself into relationships. Todd takes BoJack for a walk on the beach when he gets to the wedding and tells him that he is finally forming a relationship with Helen, and that all he had to do was strive to make the change he wanted. BoJack dances with Princess Carolyn as they reminisce on what he would do if she did not want to get married, and she promises to help him find a good agent if he decides to return to the industry. He finds Diane on the roof, where she reveals he left her a drunken voicemail the night he tried to commit suicide blaming her for not picking up the phone, and that it almost ended her relationship with Guy, but she instead moved to Houston and married him. As they acknowledge that this will likely be their last conversation, BoJack tells her a story from prison which ended with him unhappy, and muses that the point of life is that it is hard and then you die. Diane counters that the point is that it is hard and then you keep living. They agree that it is a nice night and look up at the stars together.

== Reception ==
The final season received near universal acclaim with critics and viewers considering it a poignant end to the series. On the review aggregator Rotten Tomatoes, the sixth season has an approval rating of 96%, based on 55 reviews with an average score of 9.2/10. The website's critical consensus states: "Bittersweet and brilliant to the very end, BoJack Horseman's final season manages to keep surprising viewers with its empathy and depth, solidifying its place as one of TV's greatest offerings." On Metacritic, the first part of the sixth season received a weighted average score of 93 out of 100 based on 6 critics; the second part received a score of 91 out of 100, based on 8 critics, both indicating "universal acclaim".

"Xerox of a Xerox" won the Writers Guild of America Award for Television: Animation at the 73rd Writers Guild of America Awards.
