= BoJack Horseman season 4 =

BoJack Horseman
- Season 4
- Season 4 promotional poster
- Starring: Will Arnett; Amy Sedaris; Alison Brie; Paul F. Tompkins; Aaron Paul
- No. of episodes: 12

Release
- Original network: Netflix
- Original release: September 8, 2017

Season chronology
- ← Previous; Season 3 Next → Season 5

The fourth season of the animated television series BoJack Horseman premiered exclusively via Netflix's web streaming service on September 8, 2017. Season 4 consists of 12 episodes.

== Cast ==
=== Main ===
- Will Arnett as BoJack Horseman and Butterscotch Horseman
- Amy Sedaris as Princess Carolyn
- Alison Brie as Diane Nguyen
- Paul F. Tompkins as Mr. Peanutbutter
- Aaron Paul as Todd Chavez

=== Recurring ===
- Wendie Malick as Beatrice Horseman
- Aparna Nancherla as Hollyhock Manheim-Mannheim-Guerrero-Robinson-Zilberschlag-Hsung-Fonzerelli-McQuack
- Sharon Horgan as Courtney Portnoy
- Andre Braugher as Woodchuck Coodchuck-Berkowitz
- Lake Bell as Katrina Peanutbutter
- Matthew Broderick as Joseph Sugarman
- Jane Krakowski as Honey Sugarman
- Hannibal Buress as Miles
- Raúl Esparza as Ralph Stilton
- Kimiko Glenn as Stefani Stilton
- Jessica Biel as Jessica Biel
- Margo Martindale as Legendary Character Actress Margo Martindale

=== Guest stars ===
- Marc Jacobs as Sharc Jacobs
- Rami Malek as Flip McVicker
- Colman Domingo as Eddie
- Lin-Manuel Miranda as Crackerjack Sugarman
- RuPaul as Queen Antonia
- Natalie Morales as Yolanda Buenaventura
- Kristen Bell as Ruthie
- Kristin Chenoweth as Vanessa Gekko and Miss Teach-Bot
- Keith Olbermann as Tom Jumbo-Grumbo
- Zach Braff as Famous Actor Zach Braff
- Felicity Huffman as Felicity Huffman
- Sir Mix-a-Lot as Sir Mix-a-Lot
- Paul Giamatti as Himself/TV BoJack
- Tim Gunn as Tim Gunn
- Vincent D'Onofrio as Vincent D'Onofrio

== Episodes ==
BoJack Horseman season 4 episodes
No. overall	No. in season	Title	Directed by	Written by	Original release date	Prod. code
38	1	"See Mr. Peanutbutter Run"	Amy Winfrey	Peter A. Knight	September 8, 2017	401
In 1992, Mr. Peanutbutter stumbles onto the set of what will become his show and gets the lead role by accident. Three months after BoJack's disappearance, (Note: As depicted in "That Went Well".) Mr. Peanutbutter does not get the signatures required to run for governor, but Diane unintentionally encourages him to challenge current governor Woodchuck Coodchuck-Berkowitz to a ski race for the position. Woodchuck easily triumphs over Mr. Peanutbutter in the race, but Todd, who was gifted a "drone throne" by Emily using her share of the cab company money, accidentally uses it to win the race. He immediately resigns, forcing Woodchuck to vacate the seat and win it back through a new election, which Mr. Peanutbutter pledges to partake in. As Diane watches the crowd rally around him, she leaves BoJack another voicemail, having done so throughout the episode, but finds that his mailbox is full. Princess Carolyn finds out she is pregnant but miscarries, and Ralph Stilton asks her to move in with him.
39	2	"The Old Sugarman Place"	Anne Walker Farrell	Kate Purdy	September 8, 2017	402
In the 1940s, Beatrice Horseman's brother Crackerjack is killed in World War II, and her mother Honey has a breakdown during a celebration of the end of the war. Drunk, she has Beatrice drive them home, but she crashes the car. Her father Joseph has Honey lobotomized, and she asks Beatrice to never love anyone as much as she loved her son. In the present, BoJack almost joins the wild horses, but is distracted by a call from Diane (which he ignores) and watches as they pass by him. He drives out to Beatrice's Michigan lake house, which has become dilapidated. Grumpy and flightless dragonfly Eddie helps BoJack fix it up, but BoJack tricks him into flying when he notices how depressed Eddie is. Enraged, Eddie reveals that his wife died in a flying accident and almost drowns them both out of anger for making him fly. BoJack finally calls Diane back and their banter inspires him to have the house torn down and abandon Eddie, hurt by how he was almost responsible for their deaths.
40	3	"Hooray! Todd Episode!"	Aaron Long	Elijah Aron & Jordan Young	September 8, 2017	403
Todd barely makes it to his part as a triangle player in an orchestra, and afterwards, the members tell tales of his exploits, the oboe player wishing he would take time off from all his responsibilities. Todd accidentally registers Mr. Peanutbutter as pro-fracking against Diane's wishes, and encourages her to stay true to her honest career path when she expresses doubts about her journalism. Princess Carolyn asks him to pose as the boyfriend of actress Courtney Portnoy, and he accidentally starts his own fashion line while Courtney announces their engagement. He is approached by the teenage horse looking for BoJack, a girl named Hollyhock, who claims to be BoJack's daughter and wants to find her mother; Todd tests her DNA against BoJack's and finds that they match. After explaining to BoJack that he is Hollyhock's father, they have a conversation about Todd's value and he comes out to BoJack as asexual. He chooses to go to an asexual group meeting, something he had expressed anxiety over earlier, and does not show up for the orchestra, something the oboe player is happy to see.
41	4	"Commence Fracking"	Matt Garofalo	Joanna Calo	September 8, 2017	404
BoJack and Hollyhock visit the president of his fan club who he had sex with, and Hollyhock takes her list of women BoJack has slept with while he has sex with the woman to distract her. As they go through the list, BoJack unintentionally insults Hollyhock while degrading himself, causing her to run off and forcing him to look through the list to find her. He lies about her mother still being out there to get her to stay, and invites her to live with him. Princess Carolyn buys a watch that informs her when she is at peak fertility, and she and Ralph are arrested while trying to speed home during one of these windows, forcing them to have sex in the back of a police car. Mr. Peanutbutter is unable to have sex with Diane because of the campaign, leaving both of them frustrated and unfocused. She writes a hit piece on him after he allows fracking in their house and sends it while they fight, prompting them to have sex.
42	5	"Thoughts and Prayers"	Amy Winfrey	Nick Adams	September 8, 2017	405
Courtney's new action movie is jeopardized by a series of mass shootings. Diane is initially anti-gun, but after Courtney uses her handgun to fend off a creepy guy in front of her, she quickly becomes pro-gun against Mr. Peanutbutter's wishes and popularizes the idea of women owning them, causing them to again have sex after a publicized debate. When a woman perpetrates a shooting, the California Legislature votes on banning all guns rather than helping women feel more safe. BoJack and Hollyhock visit a dementia-stricken Beatrice in her nursing home after he reveals he lied about her mother; Beatrice calls BoJack "Henrietta" and identifies old pictures of him as Crackerjack. Upset when he notices her laughing at Horsin' Around despite her previous dislike of it, (Note: As depicted in "Brand New Couch".) BoJack decides to put on a live performance to see if she recognizes him, which only makes her react violently and get thrown out of the nursing home. She moves in with him and Hollyhock assures him that he will someday be able to tell Beatrice how much he hates her. He almost puts his hand on her back, but decides against it.
43	6	"Stupid Piece of Sh*t"	Anne Walker Farrell	Alison Tafel	September 8, 2017	406
BoJack's self-loathing thoughts follow him throughout the day, represented by crudely animated sequences depicting what he is imagining. He is wounded to see Beatrice caring for a horse doll and throws it over his deck in a rage, causing her to fall into a depression. He has Mr. Peanutbutter pick up its scent and gets it back from his neighbor Felicity Huffman, on the condition that he appears on her show. Princess Carolyn and Courtney's agent, Rutabaga Rabitowitz, learn that Meryl Streep is retiring on the same day as Courtney and Todd's wedding, and so they bait Streep into taking a new role to avoid distracting Hollywoo from the wedding. Todd, worried that the wedding will conflict with his asexuality, learns that he can still experience romantic attraction but decides he is not comfortable faking a marriage. Hollyhock admits to BoJack that she has her own negative thoughts and asks if they go away; he lies to her and promises that they do.
44	7	"Underground"	Aaron Long	Kelly Galuska	September 8, 2017	407
The foundation of Mr. Peanutbutter's house collapses during a fundraiser, sending the house underground with only Todd and Princess Carolyn not trapped inside. Enraged that Mr. Peanutbutter continued to frack, Diane locks herself in her bedroom with BoJack, who she has not seen since he returned, and drinks excessively with him while admitting how unhappy she is. Woodchuck tunnels in to save the occupants, but they accidentally cause a rockslide that cuts off their exit and crushes his hands. When he tries to take charge, Katrina manipulates the crowd into subduing him and supporting Mr. Peanutbutter, who allows everyone to eat their rations. Jessica Biel burns Zach Braff alive and the survivors eat his flesh for sustenance, planning to kill Mr. Peanutbutter next. Diane and BoJack rupture a pipe to give everyone water, but only end up flooding the house, and are narrowly saved by a colony of ants Princess Carolyn strikes a deal with. After escaping, Todd, Princess Carolyn, BoJack, Diane and Mr. Peanutbutter decide to go eat injera.
45	8	"The Judge"	Otto Murga	Elijah Aron & Jordan Young	September 8, 2017	408
BoJack guest stars on "Felicity Huffmans' Booty Academy L.A." to fulfill his favor, and Hollyhock immediately falls for an intern that BoJack distrusts. He tries to expose the intern's supposed scumminess by getting a contestant to sleep with him, but she goes to the wrong person and BoJack is fired from the show. The intern approaches him and promises to leave Hollyhock alone if BoJack reads a script of his, leading BoJack to realize he was right about him all along. Todd starts a new venture involving clown dentists to make children less afraid of dentists. Mr. Peanutbutter drops out of the race and puts his full support behind a hospitalized Woodchuck, so Katrina has Biel run for governor in his stead. Princess Carolyn accompanies Ralph to meet his family during an anti-cat tradition, which makes her uncomfortable. Ralph initially says nothing, but eventually tells off his family and proudly reveals that he is having a baby with her.
46	9	"Ruthie"	Amy Winfrey	Joanna Calo	September 8, 2017	409
In the distant future, a cat named Ruthie tells her class of the worst day of her ancestor Princess Carolyn's life for a school project. Courtney fires Princess Carolyn for mishandling her action movie and the wedding, the clasp on her family heirloom necklace breaks, and she miscarries again but does not have the heart to tell Ralph. She learns that her necklace is actually cheap jewelry, and that Judah Mannowdog rejected an offer to merge with another agency on her behalf, prompting her to fire him for the clandestine rejection. She goes home to her old apartment and gets drunk with Todd and the clown dentists, and breaks up with Ralph when he finds her. She goes to her office to sleep and gets a call from BoJack, who has spent the day stuck in court searching for Hollyhock's mother. After BoJack complains about his problems, Princess Carolyn reveals that "Ruthie" is a story she tells herself whenever she feels bad.
47	10	"lovin that cali lifestyle!!"	Anne Walker Farrell	Peter A. Knight	September 8, 2017	410
Woodchuck nearly loses the race when his new hands are discovered to be those of a serial killer, but Diane has lunch with Biel and leaks to the public that she hates avocados, tanking her popularity and winning Woodchuck the seat of governor. Princess Carolyn is visited by screenwriter Flip McVicker who pitches a thriller series called Philbert, the name of the hypothetical son she and Ralph were going to have, and Todd uses his clown dentists to get her a meeting with Lenny Turtletaub. He requests BoJack play the lead role, and when Princess Carolyn cannot reach him, she reluctantly forges his signature on the contract. Todd is warned by axolotl Better Business Bureau employee Yolanda Buenaventura that he needs to shut down the clown dentist venture, so he releases the employees into the woods. Hollyhock overdoses on pills and her fathers warn BoJack to never talk to her again. BoJack blames himself until he realizes that Beatrice was spiking Hollyhock's coffee with weight loss pills, prompting him to move her into a poor quality nursing home. Before BoJack can leave, Beatrice suddenly says his name.
48	11	"Time's Arrow"	Aaron Long	Kate Purdy	September 8, 2017	411
Beatrice re-experiences important events of her life through disoriented, dreamlike flashbacks as BoJack drives her to the nursing home. After Honey's lobotomization, Beatrice contracts scarlet fever and Joseph burns her baby horse doll to stop the spread of infection. As a young adult, he attempts to force her into a relationship for business reasons at her debutante ball, where she meets Butterscotch Horseman, a drifter and aspiring novelist that she falls for and engages in a one night stand with. She finds that the man Joseph wanted her to be with is actually kind and intelligent, but Butterscotch has already impregnated her. Fueled by the trauma of seeing her doll burned, she refuses to abort the child, has a shotgun wedding with Butterscotch, and gives birth to BoJack. After BoJack grows up and leaves the home, Butterscotch impregnates their maid Henrietta Platchkey, and Beatrice, not wanting her to go down the same path she did, pays for her tuition to nursing school but also forces her to give her horse daughter up for adoption. In the present, she recognizes BoJack but does not understand where she is, so BoJack lies to her and claims they are at the Michigan summer house and eating ice cream with him and her family, something she was never allowed to do as a child.
49	12	"What Time Is It Right Now"	Tim Rauch	Raphael Bob-Waksberg	September 8, 2017	412
Princess Carolyn gets Philbert picked up by the website WhatTimeIsItRightNow.com and gets BoJack's approval to have him star in it. Todd and Yolanda discover that the clown dentists have contracted rabies, which Todd turns into another business venture that gets cleared by Yolanda. Having developed feelings for him, she reveals she is also asexual and asks him out on a date. After buying a new house, Diane and Mr. Peanutbutter go on a road trip, where she reveals she always wanted a Beauty and the Beast inspired library. She returns home to find Mr. Peanutbutter had it built for her, but is frustrated that he took her private fantasy away from her. BoJack discovers that Hollyhock is Butterscotch and Henrietta's daughter, and he gives Henrietta's number to Hollyhock's fathers. Hollyhock calls him at the airport while she is off to meet her mother, and BoJack smiles when she asks if they can accept each other as siblings.

== Reception ==
The fourth season received critical acclaim. The review aggregator Rotten Tomatoes gave the season an approval rating of 97%, based on 35 reviews with an average score of 8.7/10. The site's critical consensus states: "BoJack Horseman's fourth season finds the show continuing to traverse the emotional gamut - with results that are heartbreaking as often as they are hilarious." On Metacritic, the season has a weighted average of 87 out of 100, based on 5 reviews, indicating "universal acclaim".

IndieWire gave the season an A grade, commenting that "by the end of the season, we know these characters, and this show, far better than ever before. BoJack's signature tropes — the background visual jokes, the animal puns, the brutal moments of sadness — remain reliably consistent, but turns the focus largely inward, ensuring that some of the more outlandish plots support and highlight the more emotional storylines". The Washington Post lauded the season, praising the installment as "moving and unexpected" and that "it offers hope but never ignores the sorrows that are inevitable in real life". The New York Times also gave a positive review, commenting that the "material has the snap and the poignancy we've grown accustomed to" and that "while nothing matches the adventurousness of Season 3's underwater awards show episode, Season 4's ninth episode — narrated from the future by a distant descendant of Carolyn's — is a devastating example of what BoJack can do at its best".
