= Piece of shit (disambiguation) =

Piece of shit is a vulgar phrase used to describe something of poor quality, or someone who acts like a jerk.

Piece of shit may also refer to:

- "Piece of Shit", a song by Wet Leg from the album Wet Leg (album)
- Piece of Shit, an episode of Orange Is the New Black season 4
- Stupid Piece of Sh*t, 6th episode of BoJack Horseman season 4
