= The New Client =

- BoJack Horseman episode
- Episode no.: Season 6 Episode 2
- Directed by: Amy Winfrey
- Written by: Nick Adams
- Original release date: October 25, 2019
- Running time: 26 minutes

Guest appearances
- James Adomian as Stuart; Christine Baranski as Amanda Hannity; Julia Chan as Pickles Aplenty; Kristin Chenoweth as Vanessa Gekko; Lee Daniels as Flea Daniels; Chloë Grace Moretz as herself; Patton Oswalt as Pinky Penguin; Sam Richardson as Doctor Champo

Episode chronology
← Previous "A Horse Walks into a Rehab"	Next → "Feel-Good Story"
- BoJack Horseman (season 6)

"The New Client" is the second episode of the sixth season of the American animated comedy-drama television series BoJack Horseman, and the 62nd episode overall. Directed by Amy Winfrey and written by Nick Adams, it was released on Netflix on October 25, 2019, alongside the first half of the sixth season.

At the 47th Annie Awards, this episode was selected to represent the show in the category of Best General Audience Animated Television/Broadcast Production and went on to win the award.

== Plot ==
Princess Carolyn's nanny quits her job after complaining about the schedule. From then on, the episode uses visual copies of Princess Carolyn to represent her multiple maternal responsibilities. At work, her assistant Stuart reminds her about a photoshoot for Manatee Fair magazine's "Hollywoo Women Who Do It All" issue. Due to her duties with the baby, Princess Carolyn tells Amanda Hannity she cannot go to the shoot, but soon changes her mind when Hannity tells the story of Karen Kitada, the creator of a successful television series whose career started to collapse after having a baby.

After Todd is fired from What Time Is It Right Now, Princess Carolyn asks him to babysit while she is at the photoshoot. Princess Carolyn dozes off as Todd speaks and misses what he says, only hearing "Sure, I'd be happy to," leading Princess Carolyn to drop the baby with him. At the photoshoot, the other guests discuss organizing an event in support of women like themselves. Though exhausted, Princess Carolyn reluctantly agrees to participate, and eventually winds up with all of the responsibilities of organizing.

Exhausted and overwhelmed by demands from the event, her career, and motherhood, Princess Carolyn is mistaken as drunk, and is checked into BoJack's rehab facility. She falls asleep on a porch and wakes up two days later. Upon arriving at the now-finished event, she converses with Vanessa Gekko about her struggles and doubts as a mother. Gekko reassures her that her baby is just another job.

Ahead of the women's event, Princess Carolyn, on her way out of the clinic, calls Todd asking about the baby. Todd actually said he was busy, but since Princess Carolyn did not hear, she forced him into caring for the child. At a meeting he had scheduled, Todd mentioned "Untitled Princess Carolyn Project" (the baby's temporary name) and rumors spread among television producers about a potential Princess Carolyn project. Princess Carolyn takes advantage of the situation—during a meeting with Pinky, she sells Pinky on the Birthday Dad script as a television show, with Kitada as showrunner. Princess Carolyn settles on the name 'Ruthie' for the baby.

== Critical response ==
"The New Client" received generally positive reviews from critics. Les Chappell of The A.V. Club gave the episode a B+ rating, commenting, "It's an episode about trying to have it all that almost manages to have it all itself." He also praised Princess Carolyn's lead, the episode's visual effects, and the overall story arc. Hannah Giorgis of The Atlantic singled out the scene between Princess Carolyn and Vanessa Gekko, noting the potential changes in the former character. She wrote, "Though it focuses on a character with relative financial comfort and career stability, 'The New Client' effortlessly weaves Princess Carolyn's struggles into the show's ongoing critique of the capitalist entertainment industry. In the past, BoJack has taken aim at greedy studio executives, mega-conglomerates, and wealthy celebrities, and the new episode also nods to the recent writers' strikes that have shaken up Hollywood."
