= Thoughts and Prayers (BoJack Horseman) =

- BoJack Horseman episode
- Episode no.: Season 4 Episode 5
- Directed by: Amy Winfrey
- Written by: Nick Adams
- Original release date: September 8, 2017
- Running time: 26 minutes

Guest appearances
- Audie Cornish as Diane's Ringtone; Sharon Horgan as Courtney Portnoy; Robert Siegel as Diane's Ringtone

Episode chronology
← Previous "Commence Fracking"	Next → "Stupid Piece of Sh*t"
- BoJack Horseman season 4

"Thoughts and Prayers" is the fifth episode of the fourth season of American animated television series BoJack Horseman, and the 41st episode overall. It was written by Nick Adams and directed by Amy Winfrey, and was released in the United States, along with the rest of season four, via Netflix on September 8, 2017. Audie Cornish, Sharon Horgan, and Robert Siegel provide voices in guest appearances in the episode.

The episode follows the aftermath of a mass shooting at a mall, including the public relations and business decisions producers make in an effort to show sensitivity while carrying on with business as usual.

== Plot ==
After a mass shooting, Courtney Portnoy's film is delayed. BoJack takes Hollyhock to visit his mother, Beatrice, but Beatrice's dementia has worsened, and she does not recognize BoJack. Meanwhile, Diane begins to practice shooting at a gun range, and writes a blog post about it that goes viral, eventually leading to a change in gun laws for California.

== Reception ==
"Thoughts and Prayers" received generally positive reviews from critics. Because of the episode's title and subject matter, many focused on its approach to gun culture and mass shootings in the United States. In Slate, Marissa Martinelli, who praised the episode overall, applauded the episode's willingness to mock the oft-repeated "thoughts and prayers" response to such tragedies. Kayla Cobb of Decider praised the episode's "scathing look at Hollywood's relationship with guns". In an article for Vice's Waypoint, Danielle Riendeau called the episode "good, distinctly unsubtle satire".

Writing for The A.V. Club, Les Chappell was more critical of the episode. Describing it as "off balance", Chappell claims "the topical aspect doesn’t get the room to breathe that it needs", objecting to gun violence's exploration "in a venue that by necessity keeps the real victims in the abstract". He was, however, more complimentary about the episode's BoJack plot, describing the arrival of both his mother and daughter into his house as "a brilliant move to reinforce the season’s growing themes of family".
