= Ruthie (BoJack Horseman) =

- BoJack Horseman episode
- Episode no.: Season 4 Episode 9
- Directed by: Amy Winfrey
- Written by: Joanna Calo
- Original release date: September 8, 2017
- Running time: 26 minutes

Guest appearances
- Kristen Bell as Ruthie; Kristin Chenoweth as Vanessa Gekko; Sharon Horgan as Courtney Portnoy

Episode chronology
← Previous "The Judge"	Next → "lovin that cali lifestyle!!"
- BoJack Horseman season 4

"Ruthie" is the ninth episode of the fourth season of American animated television series BoJack Horseman, and the 45th episode overall. It was written by Joanna Calo and directed by Amy Winfrey, and was released in the United States, along with the rest of season four, via Netflix on September 8, 2017. Kristen Bell, Kristin Chenoweth, and Sharon Horgan provide voices in guest appearances in the episode.

The episode is presented as a flashback, as a story told by Princess Carolyn's relative in the future.

In February 2018, "Ruthie" was nominated for the Writers Guild of America Award for Television: Animation at the 70th WGA Awards. It lost to "Time's Arrow", another Bojack Horseman episode.

== Plot ==
Ruthie, who is Princess Carolyn's great-great-great-granddaughter, narrates the story of a particularly bad day in Carolyn's life for a school project. Through the day Carolyn learns that she has miscarried, fires her assistant Judah for declining a lucrative project without telling her, and breaks up with her boyfriend Ralph. In the end, Ruthie is revealed to have been a fantasy of Princess Carolyn, which she used to cope with her troubles.

== Reception ==
The episode received generally positive reviews from critics. In 2018, it was nominated for a Writers Guild of America Award for Television: Animation.

Lenika Cruz of The Atlantic described "Ruthie" and "Time's Arrow" as the two best episodes of the season, and saying each episode takes "full advantage of the medium to make their studies of female interiority feel like epics". Vulture gave the episode 5 stars out of 5, especially praising the episode's ending. Les Chappell of The A.V. Club gave the episode an "A" grade, noting the voice talents of Kristen Bell as the titular Ruthie.
