= Time's Arrow (BoJack Horseman) =

- BoJack Horseman episode
- Episode no.: Season 4 Episode 11
- Directed by: Aaron Long
- Written by: Kate Purdy
- Original release date: September 8, 2017
- Running time: 25 minutes

Guest appearances
- Matthew Broderick as Joseph Sugarman; Majandra Delfino as Henrietta Platchkey; Wendie Malick as Beatrice Horseman

Episode chronology
← Previous "lovin that cali lifestyle!!"	Next → "What Time Is It Right Now"
- BoJack Horseman season 4

"Time's Arrow" is the eleventh and penultimate episode of the fourth season of the American animated television series BoJack Horseman, and the 47th episode overall. It was written by Kate Purdy and directed by Aaron Long, and was released in the United States, along with the rest of season four, via Netflix on September 8, 2017. Matthew Broderick, Majandra Delfino, and Wendie Malick provide voices in guest appearances in the episode.

The episode follows a non-linear structure, looking at the life of BoJack Horseman's mother, Beatrice, through the lens of her dementia and deteriorating health.

In February 2018, "Time's Arrow" won the Writers Guild of America Award for Television: Animation at the 70th WGA Awards.

== Plot ==
Beginning where the previous episode left off, a furious BoJack drives Beatrice to a nursing home after she spiked Hollyhock's coffee with weight loss supplements, causing her to overdose. BoJack continues to grow frustrated that Beatrice cannot recognize him, and tells her they are going to a "magical place where she can never hurt anyone again". On the car ride, through Beatrice's fuzzy dementia affected memories, it is revealed how after her mother Honey was lobotomized, she is shown being bullied at school by Clemelia Bloodsworth and her posse, calling her fat and then pushing her off a slide. She then caught scarlet fever, and her father Joseph (Matthew Broderick), who initially ignored her complaints until she fainted, blamed his lobotomized wife for not noticing, and afterwards in an attempt to comfort his daughter tells her that her throat nearly being swollen shut can help her lose some weight.

As a young adult in 1963, Beatrice, who has recently earned a Bachelors degree at Barnard College, voices concern about social issues and the Civil Rights Movement out of defiance towards her father, and is shown taking what she calls "pretty pills" to stay skinny, has her debutante ball. She is pushed by her father toward a potential suitor, the awkward and dull Corbin Creamerman, whose father is the owner of a creamery and whom Joseph hopes he could partner with (in spite of him discouraging his daughter from eating ice cream or any sweets in general). Beatrice meets party crasher and dashing aspiring writer Butterscotch Horseman at the bar, and she ditches her own party to have sex with him. Two weeks later, while on a date with and genuinely beginning to connect with Corbin, Beatrice finds out she’s pregnant, and after finding him the two decide to marry and move to San Francisco. Their marriage falters as their dreams fail to pan out and the reality and stress of the baby takes a toll, especially on Beatrice who no longer has the luxuries she’s accustomed to, and they become unhappy and bitter. Butterscotch’s novel isn’t finished (not even by the time BoJack is an adult), and since nothing he writes sells he works a low income job at a fish cannery until BoJack is six where he begrudgingly takes a cushy office job for Sugarman West at Beatrice’s behest. Both smoke and drink heavily and take out their frustrations on BoJack.

In 1999, Butterscotch has an affair with their maid Henrietta, a young aspiring nurse. Beatrice convinces Henrietta to give up the baby for adoption so that she can continue in nursing school, not wanting her to make the same mistakes she did. She holds Henrietta’s hand the whole time she’s in labor, with her baby turning out to be Hollyhock, but Beatrice ignores her pleading to let her hold her baby so she won’t get attached. The episode ends with her reliving the traumatic memory of her father burning her toy doll in a fireplace, and as she sobbed he used her lobotomized mother as an example of what could happen if she lets her "womanly emotions" consume her. Just as BoJack is about to leave, Beatrice recognizes him as her son, asking him where they currently are. BoJack, instead of telling her off like he planned, lies and tells her they are at the Michigan lake house, telling her she is with her family and eating ice cream, something she was never allowed to do as a child. When he asks if she can taste the ice cream, she hesitates before saying it’s delicious.

== Production ==
=== Development and background ===
According to an interview with series creator Raphael Bob-Waksberg, writer Kate Purdy, and production designer Lisa Hanawalt, a key idea for the season was to "[soften the] edges" of Beatrice, a character who has previously been shown as "horrible". Hints of Beatrice's failing memory and "soft" personality were incorporated earlier in the season, and some aspects were added before "Time's Arrow" was written, mostly as minor "throwaway [lines]". An influence for the scene where Henrietta and Beatrice both give birth came from Purdy's own life, whose hospitalized great aunt repeatedly "[asked] for her baby". Purdy bought her aunt a doll, which gave her the thought of the "very primordial" connection between mothers and child birth, an idea she incorporated into the scene.

=== Animation ===
The episode's extras proved difficult to animate, as many were designed without faces to emphasize Beatrice's failing memory. After "some back and forth", it was decided that blurring the faces of the extras would be the simplest solution. Hanawalt likened "Time's Arrow"'s use of a "static scribble" to a similar sequence from the episode Stupid Piece of Sh*t, in which BoJack repeatedly calls himself an idiot, a stylistic choice that Hanawalt described as "fun".

Animation director Aaron Long had a "lot of conversations" with the animation staff over how to accurately portray dementia through visuals, and the episode "[broke] some of the [shows] rules" in an effort to do so. The scene in which a slide is portrayed as being "like a million feet tall" was conceived as such early in the episode's storyboarding, and an animator later made it "twisty". The slide was drawn in that way to represent Beatrice's "twisted, demented memory" of the experience.

== Analysis ==
"Time's Arrow" explores themes of dementia and trauma. Vulture's Jen Chaney identified the episode's animation as showing how "scrambled" Beatrice's mind and mental function have become. Chaney uses Beatrice's housekeeper, Henrietta, and her "jumbled scribble" characteristics as an example of this.

== Reception ==
"Time's Arrow" received universal acclaim from critics, many of whom described it as one of the best episodes of the season and of the series. Les Chappell of The A.V. Club, who gave the episode an "A", wrote that there was "no episode of television to simultaneously anticipate and dread more in the year than ["Time's Arrow"]. Julia Alexander, writing for Polygon, described "Time's Arrow" as "TV's best episode of 2017". In The Atlantic, Lenika Cruz noted the episode's effectiveness at its portrayal of female characters.
