= Hank After Dark =

- BoJack Horseman episode
- Episode no.: Season 2 Episode 7
- Directed by: Amy Winfrey
- Written by: Kelly Galuska
- Original release date: July 17, 2015
- Running time: 26 minutes

Guest appearances
- Philip Baker Hall as Hank Hippopopalous; Keegan-Michael Key as Sebastian St. Clair; Lisa Kudrow as Wanda Pierce; Scott Wolf as Scott Wolf

Episode chronology
← Previous "Higher Love"	Next → "Let's Find Out"
- BoJack Horseman season 2

"Hank After Dark" is the seventh episode of the second season of American animated television series BoJack Horseman, and the 19th episode overall. It was written by Kelly Galuska and directed by Amy Winfrey, and was released in the United States, along with the rest of season two, via Netflix on July 17, 2015. Philip Baker Hall, Keegan-Michael Key, Lisa Kudrow, and Scott Wolf provide voices in guest appearances in the episode.

In 2015, the episode was nominated for a Writers Guild of American Award for Television: Animation at the 68th Writers Guild of America Awards.

== Plot ==
Diane finds herself in hot water when, during Princess Carolyn's book promotion of BoJack's autobiography in paperback form, she calls attention to sexual misconduct allegations against a beloved television personality named Hank Hippopopalous. While Mr. Peanutbutter begins the production of his new game show, Todd switches places with the prince of the war-torn country Cordovia.

== Reception ==
"Hank After Dark" received generally positive reviews from critics. The episode received attention for its character of Hank Hippopopalous, whose situation is compared to that of Bill Cosby after Diane accidentally reveals sexual assault accusations made against him. For AV Club, Caroline Framke, who gave the episode an A− grade, praised the episode's embracing of scandal, writing, "It's an incredibly bold episode, not just because of its subject matter, but because of its ensuing commentary and the fury with which it condemns Hollywood". She continued, saying "Hank Hippopalous is first and foremost an amalgam for all the rich dudes in Hollywood who can get away with whatever they want".
