= Stupid Piece of Sh*t =

- BoJack Horseman episode
- Episode no.: Season 4 Episode 6
- Directed by: Anne Walker Farrell
- Written by: Alison Tafel
- Original release date: September 8, 2017
- Running time: 26 minutes

Guest appearances
- Fielding Edlow as Roxy; Sharon Horgan as Courtney Portnoy; Felicity Huffman as herself

Episode chronology
← Previous "Thoughts and Prayers"	Next → "Underground"
- BoJack Horseman season 4

"Stupid Piece of Sh*t" is the sixth episode of the fourth season of American animated television series BoJack Horseman, and the 42nd episode overall. It was written by Alison Tafel and directed by Anne Walker Farrell, and was released in the United States, along with the rest of season four, via Netflix on September 8, 2017. Fielding Edlow, Sharon Horgan, and Felicity Huffman provide voices in guest appearances in the episode.

In 2017, the episode received two nominations for the 45th Annie Awards, including Best General Audience Animated Television Production and Outstanding Achievement for Editorial in an Animated Television/Broadcast Production.

== Plot ==
The episode begins with BoJack lying in bed while his internal monologue calls him a "stupid piece of shit." Hollyhock asks BoJack to go to the store to get some milk, but he spends the day at the bar instead. The next day, BoJack avoids having breakfast with Hollyhock and his mother Beatrice, instead sitting in his car on the side of Mulholland Drive. Throughout this, the viewer continues to hear BoJack's self-berating inner voice, sometimes accompanied by cartoon drawings illustrating his thoughts and fears.

Meanwhile, actress Courtney Portnoy tells Princess Carolyn that she has fired her agent and replaced him with Carolyn's ex, Rutabaga Rabitowitz. Rutabaga wants Portnoy to have a high-profile wedding to her fake fiancé Todd Chavez, who is still coming to terms with his asexuality.

When BoJack arrives home, he finds that Hollyhock has given Beatrice a baby horse doll to look after, in the hopes that it would aid her dementia. BoJack becomes angry with the doll, which is receiving better treatment from Beatrice than he himself ever did, and throws the doll over the side of his house. Beatrice becomes upset and, at Hollyhock's urging, BoJack agrees to bring the doll back. He enlists the help of Mr. Peanutbutter, who uses his sense of smell to find the doll at Felicity Huffman's house. Huffman calls BoJack a "stupid piece of shit." After convincing her to return the doll, BoJack opens up to Mr. Peanutbutter and admits his discomfort with Hollyhock's attachment to him, fearing his worst tendencies will shine through eventually. Mr. Peanutbutter tells BoJack that he deserves to be loved despite his past mistakes.

Rutabaga and Carolyn successfully devise a plan to prevent Meryl Streep from retiring the same day as Portnoy's wedding. Although the wedding falls through at Todd's behest, Rutabaga and Carolyn are happy with how well they work as a team. Rutabaga returns to his family, and Princess Carolyn removes a positive pregnancy test from her purse.

Upon returning home with the baby doll, BoJack sees Hollyhock in the backyard and goes to talk with her. She confronts him about his recent absence and asks if she has done anything to alienate him. BoJack insists that he is glad to have met her, and his behavior is not her fault. Hollyhock reveals she sometimes experiences bouts of self-loathing herself, and asks if it will go away with time. Though saddened and shaken to hear this, BoJack tells her it will.

== Production ==
"Stupid Piece of Sh*t" was written by Alison Tafel, who joined the BoJack Horseman writing staff in season four. The episode was directed by Anne Walker Farrell, who started working on the show in season 1 as a storyboard artist.

The episode was originally supposed to be told from the perspective of Princess Carolyn's assistant, Judah Mannowdog (voiced by Diedrich Bader). However, Judah's limited presence within the narrative made it difficult to tie his perspective into the adventures of most of the characters, and series creator Raphael Bob-Waksberg decided, in his words, that "the most interesting brain to be in is BoJack's."

Series creator Raphael Bob-Waksberg said that the main themes of the season are family, particularly "what we do to our family, what we do to be in a family, as well as biological and created families," and "the stories we tell, particularly the internal story." Bob-Waksberg describes BoJack's internal monologue as resembling a DVD commentary, and the loose animation as "the way BoJack sees himself, which is very messy and unformed." The crude animations that represent BoJack's depression were designed by Farrell, assistant director Otto Murga, and production designer Lisa Hanawalt. Hanawalt told Vanity Fair that the cartoons were inspired by animation from the 1960s, as well as her own comics. She considers the episode to be "the gold standard of how to capture a mood with an art style."

== Reception ==
"Stupid Piece of Sh*t" received largely positive reviews from critics. Les Chappell of The A.V. Club gave the episode an "A" grade, calling it "brutally honest" and "completely accurate in [its] portrayal" of depression.

The episode's depiction of BoJack's depression was particularly lauded. Julia Alexander of Polygon praised the way in which Bob-Waksberg and BoJack Horseman "lean into" the "true horrors of depression," particularly when BoJack throws the baby doll over the side of his house. Writing for the Miami New Times, Chris Packham said that BoJack's internal monologue was depicted with the "unsparing realism" of someone suffering from depression. Nadine Kaslow, a chief psychologist and professor at Emory University School of Medicine, lauded the episode's characterization of depression, particularly the way in which BoJack's negative self-talk spirals push him lower.
