= Amy Winfrey =

American animator and web series creator (born 1975)

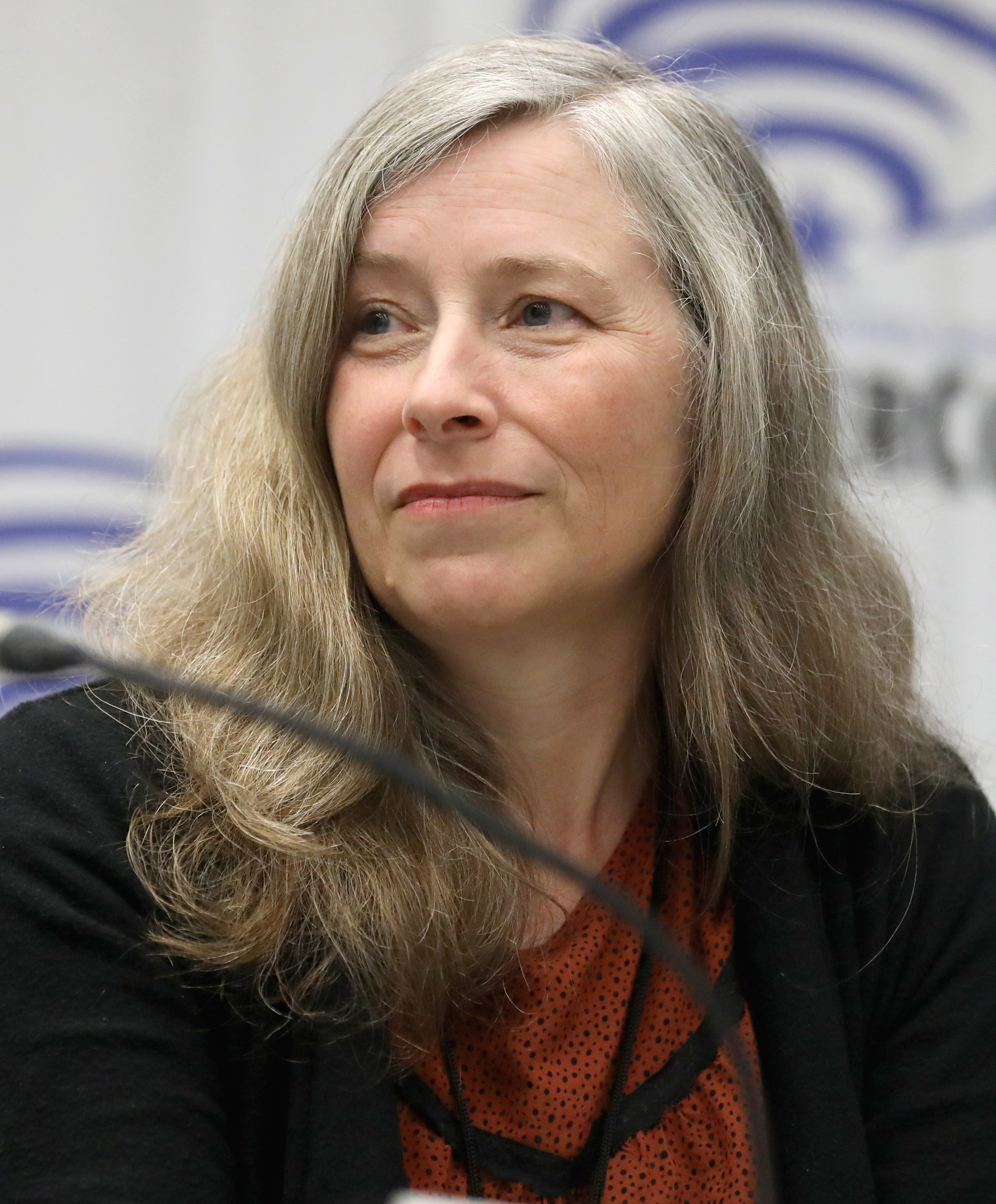
- Winfrey at the 2024 WonderCon
- Born: October 1975 (age 51); Los Angeles, California, U.S.
- Education: University of California, Los Angeles
- Occupations: Animator; writer; songwriter; director; voice actress; educator
- Years active: 1995–present
- Notable credit(s): Making Fiends, South Park, Bojack Horseman
- Spouse: Peter Merryman
- Website: amywinfrey.com

Amy Winfrey (born October 1975) is an American animator, writer, songwriter, director and voice actress. She is best known for creating the web series Making Fiends that later became a TV series picked up by Nicktoons Network in 2008, and for directing several episodes of BoJack Horseman, including "The View from Halfway Down" and "Free Churro", which were each nominated for a Primetime Emmy Award for Outstanding Animated Program at the 71st and 72nd Primetime Creative Arts Emmys.

== Career ==
Winfrey studied animation at UCLA and made a 3D film called The Bad Plant, which won her a silver medal at the Student Academy Awards in 2000. While attending school, Winfrey worked as an animator on South Park starting with the pilot episode, 'The Spirit of Christmas: Jesus vs. Santa' in 1995. When Comedy Central picked up the series, Winfrey remained part of the animation team and continued to work on the show, pausing her schooling to work on the feature film South Park Bigger, Longer & Uncut.

In a UCLA class, Winfrey made a website dedicated to traffic cones. Because of many visitors on the traffic cone website, Winfrey decided to create a series of short web cartoons, and the result was Muffin Films. The first was created as a thesis project in 2000 and lasted twelve episodes, one for each muffin in a dozen. The series explored different styles of Flash animation through twelve different shorts, using muffins as the subject of the stories. To celebrate the 10th Anniversary of Muffin Films, Amy Winfrey created six additional cartoons for the series.

In 2001, Winfrey created another web series, Big Bunny. Winfrey provided all of the voice acting, except for the eponymous character who is voiced by her husband, Peter Merryman. Winfrey pitched it as a series for NBC and Fox in 2002, but neither picked it up.

In 2008, Winfrey started Squid and Frog, short cartoons about a red squid and an orange frog, who sing about various things, such as that you can't learn surgery from television.

On 6 October 2018, Winfrey released a web cartoon called Hooray For Hell, co-created by Peter Merryman. The series is about a girl who wakes up in Hell after voting for president and gets a ticket to Heaven. There are three episodes available on YouTube. They can be found by clicking the link in the description of the trailer on Winfrey's main channel. After a hiatus, the show's final two episodes were uploaded on May 27, 2020.

=== Making Fiends ===
Winfrey created Making Fiends in 2003 as a web cartoon. The series has 21 episodes created between 2003 and 2005. Winfrey voiced several characters, including Charlotte. Winfrey was able to produce web animation full time after she began selling merchandise of her characters online. Nickelodeon contacted Winfrey in early 2004 about bringing Making Fiends on TV. The series only had one season, airing from October 4 to November 1, 2008, on the secondary channel Nicktoons Network. Viacom, now Paramount Global, retained the rights to the property after the series was canceled. Despite the limited run, the series was named "Best Television Series" at Annecy International Animation Film Festival in 2008.

=== Recent work ===
For a five-year period between 2014 and 2019, Winfrey worked as director on all six seasons of the Netflix animated series BoJack Horseman, typically working on three episodes per season, including some of the series' most notable episodes, Zoës and Zeldas, Brand New Couch, Hank After Dark, Thoughts and Prayers, Ruthie, Free Churro, The New Client, and the show's penultimate episode, 'The View From Halfway Down.' She was nominated twice for the Primetime Emmy Award for Outstanding Animated Program by the Academy of Television Arts & Sciences for "Free Churro" and "The View From Halfway Down". She also worked on the second season of 'Greatest Party Story Ever', an animated episode of Adam Ruins Everything, the first season of Tuca & Bertie. She was a supervising producer on the Max series Velma.

== Personal life ==
Winfrey resides in Los Angeles, California with her husband, Peter Merryman. She has also been an educator teaching animation at the UCLA Animation Workshop.

== Web series ==
=== Muffin Films ===
Episode list

Year	Title	Episode	Summary
2000	Hungry!	1	A girl eats a muffin. A bigger muffin comes. The big muffin eats the girl.
2000	U.F.M	2	Alien muffins come to earth, planning to take over. They unintentionally land on a bake sale table.
2000	I Dream of Muffins	3	A dream sequence about muffins.
2000	Pssst...	4	A girl meets a group of talking muffins who wish to be eaten. They try to convince her to eat them.
2000	Muffinesque	5	A stop motion animated video.
2000	The Muffin Tree	6	One day, a little girl finds a muffin tree. (Most likely a reference to The Giving Tree.) After she eats a strange type of muffin, she dies.
2000	M	7	A girl meets a muffin that doesn't want to be eaten. After a small conversation, she eats him.
2000	Feed Me	8	An interactive game in which you feed a woman different muffins before she dies. If you overfeed her, she explodes, and if you don’t feed her, she dies.
2000	Beware	9	Old Man Muffin wants revenge on Mr. Turnpike, a human being who "did him in".
2000	The Muffinless	10	The story of a young boy named Harold, who has never eaten a muffin and really wants one.
2000	Bluebirds in Spring	11	Two muffins saying random things in French to each other.
2000	MufFinale	12	Muffins from all the films sing to a girl after she says "I don't like muffins." to convince her that muffins are good for her.
2010	Mini Muffins	I	Mini muffins haunt a young girl, leading her to eat one. After which, the mini muffins get scared and haunt her to eat other things.
2010	Lines	II	Muffins moving on power lines.
2010	Nothing	III	Sounds made by different things on the farm in three different scenarios, including a normal day, a Nuclear War, and an apocalyptic future. The muffin says nothing, and surprisingly survives throughout all 3 scenarios.
2010	Variety Mix	IV	Muffins are grown in a muffin tin using muffin seeds before escaping and being recaptured in a muffin box.
2010	The Feral Muffin	V	A feral muffin terrorizes the other muffins in the tin until only he remains.
2010	Muffin Parade	VI	Muffins sing as they parade into someone's mouth.
2011	Mini Holiday Muffins	VII	The Mini Muffins introduce their unsavory friends Eggnog, Fruitcake, Gingerbread and Candy Cane.
2015	Twelve Muffins	VIII	12 Muffins set out on Christmas Day in the morning.

=== Big Bunny (2001) ===
Episode list

Year	Title	Episode #	Summary
2001	The Delicious Dog	1	In this episode, Big Bunny meets Suzy, Lulu, and Sam for the first time. Their dog, Muffin, runs into a forest. the children chase him but cannot find him. In the forest, they meet Big Bunny, who tells them a story about the Delicious Dog. After the children leave, Big Bunny pulls out a large tupperware container with the dog inside.
2001	Vegetables	2	The friends start out going back into the forest to see Big Bunny. Big Bunny then tells them a story about a turnip that was eaten by a king. The turnip's friends start a revolution and the story ends with vegetables ruling the kingdom. As the children leave, Big Bunny reminds them to eat lots of food and asks them to bring him a cat.
2001	Suzy	3	This episode starts out with the friends in the woods greeting Big Bunny with a cat from Ms. Grundimier's front porch. Then, Big Bunny tells them a story about a girl who sells her soul to the devil but eventually repents and goes to heaven. After the story, Big Bunny gives the children gouda to eat.
2001	Easter	4	In this episode, Big Bunny tells a story about a blue bird who died and rose from the dead three days later and eats flesh of the living. Big Bunny ends the episode by telling the friends to eat plenty of candy and egg yolks.
2001	Red	5	Big Bunny tells the children a story about a "red squirrel," who is actually Big Bunny. He tells of the "squirrel" inviting his enemies to dinner, where he kills them and makes them into pie. He then sends the pie to all who declined his invitation. The episode ends with Big Bunny reminding the children to eat plenty.
2001	Business	6	Big Bunny tells a story about a paper clip who has affairs with a notepad while married to a staple. The episode ends when Big Bunny tells the friends to bring another friend of theirs so there is more kids to listen to his stories. He also tells the friends to eat plenty of butter pats and share them with their friends.
2001	Stuffing	7	This final episode starts out with the three friends going into the woods. On their way, they see a sign that reads: "Crusty Pines phase III; coming soon, forest demolition starts tomorrow." The friends jump over the fence to warn Big Bunny his home will be destroyed. Big Bunny then tells a story of the man who bought a jacket. The cashier told him to never put his hand in the left pocket, but one day the man did and the pocket ate his hand. He then returned the jacket in anger and bought a sweater. The episode ends with Big Bunny saying he is moving on to plumper pastures, and asks the children to go with him. Suzy refuses to go and waves them goodbye while telling him to eat lots of carrots, stupid bunny.

== Filmography ==
=== Television ===
Year	Title	Notes
1997–1999	South Park	Animator
2008	Making Fiends	Creator, voice actress, songwriter & co-executive producer
2014–2019	BoJack Horseman	Director
2016	Greatest Party Story Ever	Segment director, character designer, lead storyboard artist & lead background artist
2017	Adam Ruins What We Learned in School	Director
2019	Tuca & Bertie	Director
2023–2024	Velma	Supervising producer

=== Film ===
Year	Title	Notes
1999	South Park: Bigger, Longer & Uncut	Animator

=== Short films ===
Year	Title	Notes
1995	The Spirit of Christmas	Lip Sync Artist

=== Other works ===
Year	Title	Notes
2003–2015	Making Fiends	Creator
