= Aaron Long (animator) =

Canadian animator and filmmaker

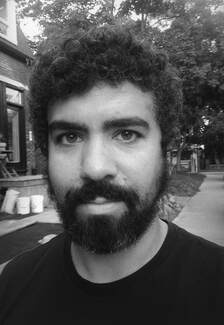
- Long in 2024
- Born: Toronto, Ontario, Canada
- Occupations: Animator, filmmaker

Aaron Long is a Canadian animator and filmmaker. He is best known for his independent cartoons Sublo and Tangy Mustard and Fester Fish, and his work on the television series BoJack Horseman and Tuca & Bertie.

Long principally uses the software Adobe Flash and Adobe Photoshop to create his films. Long's work is strongly influenced by theatrical animation of the 1940s, particularly directors Bob Clampett, Tex Avery and Chuck Jones.

In 2012, he began animating the short "Bakerman and the Bunnymen" for Sonic Bunny Productions.

Since June 2013, he has resided in Los Angeles and worked at ShadowMachine directing key episodes of various TV series including TripTank, BoJack Horseman and Tuca & Bertie. In 2016, he was a key contributor to BoJack Horseman's "Fish Out of Water" episode. In 2017, he directed the episode "Time's Arrow". Executive producer Lisa Hanawalt stated "This episode really changed as we were working on it, and I also will say the director of the episode, Aaron Long, is responsible for a lot of that."

In 2015, Long started his new independent online animated series Sublo and Tangy Mustard, set in Toronto, Canada. The show follows two costumed fast food mascots for a sub sandwich chain named Subpar who slack off at work, as well as their co-worker Katy who struggles with a failed art career. The duo are not allowed to take off their costumes even outside of their jobs, with Long having no intention of revealing their true names or identities. Every episode is written and animated by Long himself with additional voice actors, and are uploaded to YouTube and Newgrounds. The series was featured in a retrospective screening and panel at the Animation Block Party festival in Brooklyn.

In 2019, he directed three episodes of the animated series Tuca & Bertie, as well as the show's opening credits. In an interview, Long claimed "This show has been the most fun I've had in my career so far, especially directing the main title sequence."

== Biography ==
Long is from Toronto, Ontario, Canada. He attended and graduated from Max the Mutt College of Animation, Art & Design in Toronto, where he first started making cartoons on his own using Adobe Flash. Outside of schoolwork, Long posted his animated creations on YouTube, including a series starring his original character "Fester Fish", an anthropomorphic character influenced by classic Warner Bros. cartoons. Fester Fish was discovered by companies in Los Angeles, who began hiring Long for freelance work while he was completing his studies. He has worked as a director, animator, character designer, and storyboarder on shows such as BoJack Horseman (Netflix), Greatest Party Story Ever (MTV) and TripTank (Comedy Central), as well as his own original projects Sublo and Tangy Mustard and Fester Fish.

== Filmography ==
=== Television ===
Year	Title	Role	Notes
2014–2016	TripTank	—N/a	Animator, background artist, and character designer, 13 episodes; Director, 12 episodes
2015–present	Sublo and Tangy Mustard	Various roles	Also director, writer, and animator; 19 episodes
2016	Greatest Party Story Ever	—N/a	Animator, 3 episodes; Director, 2 episodes
2017	Bojack Horseman	—N/a	Animation director, 3 episodes; Director, 9 episodes
2019–2022	Tuca & Bertie	—N/a	Supervising director, season 2; Animation director and animator, 10 episodes; Director, 6 episodes

=== Shorts ===
Year	Title	Role	Notes
2008	Slick Nick Private Dick	Slick Nick Private Dick	Also director, writer, animator, producer, and background artist
2009	Fugitive Goose	Various roles	Also director, writer, editor and animator
2009	Space Race 7000	Various roles	Also director, writer, editor and animator
2009	Banquet Bust-Up	Various roles	Also director, writer, editor and animator
2010–2013	Fester Fish	Fester Fish	Also director, writer, animator, producer, and background artist
2013	Join the Soup	—N/a	Animator, background artist, and character designer
2013	Bakerman and the Bunnymen	—N/a	Animator, background artist, and character designer
