= Kate Purdy =

American writer and producer

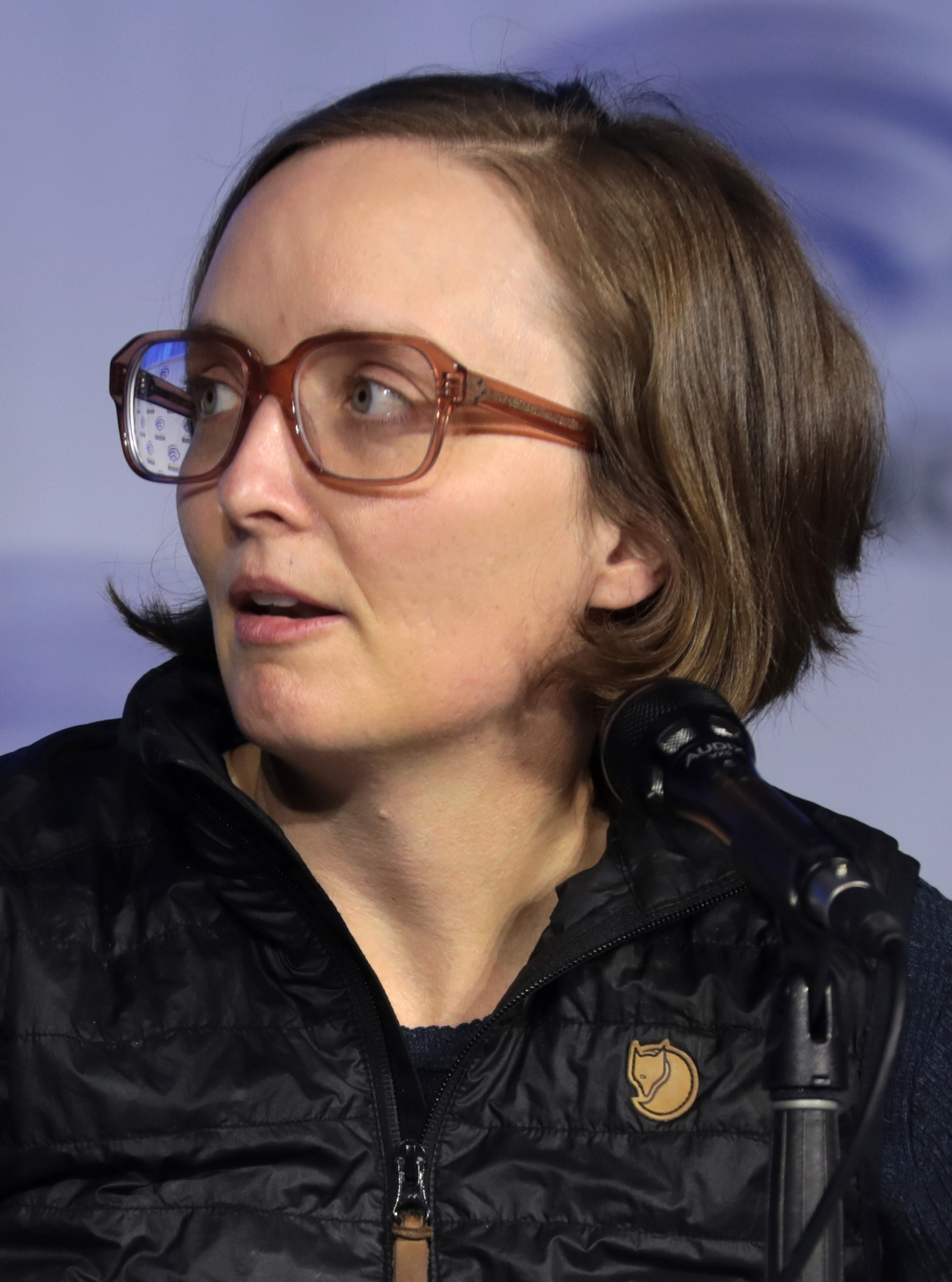
Purdy at the 2022 WonderCon

Kate Purdy is an American writer and producer of television series. She grew up in San Antonio, Texas, United States. She is known for her work as a writer on the Netflix adult animated comedy series BoJack Horseman, which she also produced. She received the Writers Guild of America Award for Television: Animation in 2017 for the BoJack episode "Time's Arrow." Purdy is also the creator and writer of the Amazon Prime Video series Undone.

== Personal life ==
Purdy grew up in San Antonio, Texas. Her father was a Spanish teacher and the family lived for several years in Guadalajara, Mexico. In 2012, Purdy became depressed and suffered anxiety whilst working as a writer on the Cougar Town television series. She became concerned that she might have schizophrenia since her grandmother and two grand-uncles had schizophrenia. After trying various treatments, Purdy finally found benefits in indigenous and Ayurvedic medicines. She graduated from Wesleyan University in 2001.

== Career ==
Purdy began her career in television writing for shows such as Cold Case and Mad TV in the mid-2000s.

Between 2014 and 2018, Purdy wrote five episodes for BoJack Horseman, the acclaimed adult animated comedy series screened on Netflix. Purdy received the Writers Guild of America Award for Television: Animation in 2017 for the BoJack episode "Time's Arrow." She was also one of the producers of the show.

Purdy co-created a new animated television series called Undone in 2019, with her BoJack Horseman collaborator Raphael Bob-Waksberg. The eight half hour episodes were screened on Amazon Prime Video. Undone was Amazon's first original animated series and was made using the rotoscoping technique. Purdy drew upon her own experiences of mental illness in plotting the themes of the show.

In late 2019, Amazon announced that Undone had been renewed for a second season and that Purdy had signed an exclusive deal. No details of the latter agreement were released.

== Selected productions ==
Year	Title	Role
2019–2022	Undone	Co-creator, writer, executive producer
2014–2018	BoJack Horseman	Writer, producer
2014–2015	The McCarthys	Writer, producer
2014	Enlisted	Writer, producer
2010–2012	Cougar Town	Writer, story editor

== Awards and honors ==
- 2017, Writers Guild of America Award for Television: Animation
