= BoJack Horseman =

American adult animated tragicomedy television series

- Genre: Adult animation; Tragicomedy; Black comedy; Surreal humor; Psychological drama; Satire
- Created by: Raphael Bob-Waksberg
- Showrunner: Raphael Bob-Waksberg
- Voices of: Will Arnett; Amy Sedaris; Alison Brie; Paul F. Tompkins; Aaron Paul
- Theme music composer: Patrick Carney featuring Ralph Carney
- Ending theme: "Back in the '90s (BoJack's Theme)" by Grouplove
- Composer: Jesse Novak
- Country of origin: United States
- Original language: English
- No. of seasons: 6
- No. of episodes: 76 (+ 1 special) (list of episodes)

Production
- Executive producers: Raphael Bob-Waksberg; Noel Bright; Steven A. Cohen; Blair Fetter; Jane Wiseman; Will Arnett; Aaron Paul; Andy Weil
- Producers: Alex Bulkley; Corey Campodonico; Mehar Sethi; Lisa Hanawalt; Kate Purdy; Mike Hollingsworth
- Running time: 25 minutes
- Production companies: Tornante Television; Boxer vs. Raptor; ShadowMachine

Original release
- Network: Netflix
- Release: August 22, 2014 – January 31, 2020

BoJack Horseman is an American adult animated tragicomedy television series created by Raphael Bob-Waksberg. It stars the voices of Will Arnett, Amy Sedaris, Alison Brie, Paul F. Tompkins, and Aaron Paul. Set primarily in Hollywood, (Note: Renamed to Hollywoo for most of the series, and Hollywoob in the finale) the series revolves around the anthropomorphic horse BoJack Horseman (Arnett), a washed-up star of a 1990s sitcom who plans a return to relevance with an autobiography to be written by ghostwriter Diane Nguyen (Brie). It also chronicles his contentions with his agent, Princess Carolyn (Sedaris), former rival Mr. Peanutbutter (Tompkins), roommate Todd Chavez (Paul), and his declining mental health. The series is designed by cartoonist Lisa Hanawalt, a longtime friend to Bob-Waksberg who previously collaborated on the webcomic Tip Me Over, Pour Me Out.

The series premiered on Netflix on August 22, 2014. On September 20, 2018, Netflix renewed the show for its sixth and final season, and the series ended on January 31, 2020, with a total of 77 episodes. The first five seasons consist of 12 episodes each, while the sixth and final season consists of 16 episodes divided into two parts of eight episodes each. A one-off Christmas special was also released on December 19, 2014.

BoJack Horseman received mixed reviews upon release. However, critics were significantly more positive towards the second half of the first season, and the subsequent seasons received widespread critical acclaim; praise was given to its animation, voice acting, humor, mature themes, character development, emotional weight, writing and approach to its subject matter, which explores depression, trauma, abortion, adoption, addiction, self-destructive behavior, suicide, racism, sexism, speciesism, teen pregnancy, sexuality, and the human condition. Since its conclusion, the show has been hailed as one of the greatest television series of all time and appeared on several "best-of" television lists by various publications.

The series received numerous accolades, including four Critics' Choice Television Awards for Best Animated Series, three Annie Awards and two Writers Guild of America Awards. It has also received three Primetime Emmy Award nominations including Outstanding Animated Program twice and Outstanding Character Voice-Over Performance for Kristen Schaal.

== Premise ==
The series is set in an alternate world where humans and anthropomorphic animals live side by side, taking place mostly in Hollywood (renamed to "Hollywoo" early in the first season after the D is stolen from the sign). BoJack Horseman is the washed-up star of the fictional 1990s sitcom Horsin' Around, which centered around a young bachelor horse trying to raise three human children who had been orphaned.

Now living in relative obscurity in his Hollywood Hills mansion, BoJack plans a substantial comeback to celebrity relevance with a tell-all autobiography to be written by ghostwriter Diane Nguyen. At the same time, he deals with his addiction to alcohol and other drugs, as well as the resulting repercussions for his actions. BoJack also has to contend with the demands of his agent and former girlfriend Princess Carolyn, the misguided antics of his freeloading roommate Todd Chavez, and the upbeat personality of his former rival Mr. Peanutbutter.

== Cast and characters ==
- Promotional poster showcasing the main cast, which includes: BoJack, Diane, Princess Carolyn, Mr. Peanutbutter, and Todd, alongside key recurring characters against the "Hollywoo" backdrop, illustrating the series' distinct character and overall art style.
  Will Arnett as BoJack Horseman, a self-loathing, cynical, alcoholic horse currently in his 50s, whose acting career peaked when he starred in a successful 1990s family sitcom called Horsin' Around. Though he began as a bright-eyed young actor, he has since grown bitter, deeply depressed, and jaded towards Hollywood and who he has become post-fame. BoJack has been shown to be caring and insightful, but his insecurities, loneliness, desperate need for approval, and guilt over his own actions often result in self-destructive and selfish actions which devastate those around him. His past and present relationships with his abusive, alcoholic parents and his attempts at overcoming their legacy are a continual theme of the series.
- Amy Sedaris as Princess Carolyn, a pink Persian cat who is BoJack's agent in the first three seasons and former on-and-off girlfriend. Hailing from Eden, North Carolina, Princess Carolyn was a top agent at Vigor agency before leaving to start a new agency with her then-boyfriend and coworker Rutabaga Rabitowitz. She ultimately decides to leave him and run the new company named VIM by herself. After several setbacks, Princess Carolyn closes VIM in season 3, only to reopen it as a management agency. She struggles throughout the series in starting a family and suffers several miscarriages. In season 5, after several failed attempts, she successfully adopts a baby porcupine called Ruthie from pregnant teen, Sadie, a young woman from her hometown. In the series finale, she marries Judah, her assistant.
- Alison Brie as Diane Nguyen, a Vietnamese-American third-wave feminist from Boston. She is hired as a ghostwriter for BoJack's memoir, and throughout the show she has several jobs involving writing. Diane and BoJack develop a strong friendship that initially becomes awkward and strained after BoJack develops romantic feelings for her, especially as she was dating Mr. Peanutbutter at the time. She eventually marries Mr. Peanutbutter, but they divorce at the beginning of season 5. She eventually realizes she has depression, and gains weight as her mental health improves due to antidepressants; news media celebrated the series' realistic portrayal of her changing body shape as a sign of improved health. During the sixth season, Diane develops a relationship with a bison named Guy (whom she goes on to wed) and comes to terms with her neglectful upbringing. She is a graduate of Boston University.
- Paul F. Tompkins as Mr. Peanutbutter, an energetic, optimistic and cheerful yellow Labrador Retriever who is BoJack's former sitcom rival. Mr. Peanutbutter was the star of Mr. Peanutbutter's House, which, according to BoJack, "borrowed the premise" from Horsin' Around. Despite their rivalry, Mr. Peanutbutter cares a great deal about BoJack's opinion and admires him for his work on Horsin' Around. He has an especially good relationship with Todd, and his positive attitude and financial resources combined with Todd's outlandish schemes and plans often result in the two starting questionable business ventures. Mr. Peanutbutter has been married three times (to Katrina Peanutbutter, Jessica Biel and Diane Nguyen). After his divorce with Diane, he begins a relationship with a waitress named Pickles. He is a graduate of Northwestern University and a native of Newfoundland and Labrador, Canada.
- Aaron Paul as Todd Chavez, an unemployed 24-year-old human who ended up at BoJack's house for a party five years before the beginning of the series and never left. Despite constantly voicing disdain for Todd, Bojack continues to support him financially and sabotages Todd's attempts to gain independence. Todd has been shown to possess a plethora of skills including writing and composing his own rock opera, which was eventually sabotaged by BoJack. This and other examples of BoJack's poor behavior towards him lead Todd to break ties with BoJack in season 4. He eventually becomes Princess Carolyn's assistant, and babysitter for her daughter, Ruthie. He realizes in the season 3 finale "That Went Well" that he is asexual. In season 6, Todd forms a relationship with a rabbit named Maude who is also asexual.

== Episodes ==
Season	Episodes		Originally released
1	12		August 22, 2014
Special			December 19, 2014
2	12		July 17, 2015
3	12		July 22, 2016
4	12		September 8, 2017
5	12		September 14, 2018
6	16	8	October 25, 2019
6	16	8	January 31, 2020

== Production ==
=== Conception ===
After moving to Los Angeles for the first time, writer Raphael Bob-Waksberg unsuccessfully pitched ideas for shows to different networks. Among them was the idea for a family comedy set during the Reign of Terror called The Good Times Are Killing Me, which Waksberg described as "All in the Family but in France, ... where the Dad was a guillotine salesman and business was booming, but he couldn't get his wacky family in order." Around the same time, he moved into a friend's house up in the Hollywood Hills, living in what he described as "a glorified closet in a beautiful mansion". He "look[ed] out on the deck over all of Hollywood, and [felt] simultaneously on top of the world and never more isolated and alone." This was the beginning of the idea that would become BoJack Horseman.

Bob-Waksberg and illustrator Lisa Hanawalt had met in high school and the two would often joke about creating an animated series together. The two eventually went their separate ways, with Bob-Waksberg moving to Los Angeles and Hanawalt moving to New York, but stayed in touch, working together on the web comic Tip Me Over, Pour Me Out. In March 2010, Bob-Waksberg emailed Hanawalt asking for a drawing of one of the "horse-guys" she had been sketching, outlining a pitch for a show he titled "BoJack the Depressed Talking Horse". This early pitch hewed closely to the final product except for some minor differences – Todd was called Topher and was BoJack's childhood friend; Diane was a development executive instead of a ghostwriter; and Mr. Peanutbutter was BoJack's agent instead of Princess Carolyn, with his role as BoJack's rival instead filled by a horse called Honeybucket. Hanawalt joked that the concept sounded too depressing.

=== Development history ===
In late 2010, Bob-Waksberg met with producer Steven A. Cohen of the Tornante Company and pitched five different animated projects, including BoJack Horseman. After the pitch, Cohen asked Bob-Waksberg which project interested him most, and Bob-Waksberg chose BoJack Horseman. He wrote up a treatment for the series which was then pitched to the Tornante Company CEO Michael Eisner, who suggested that the show center around a former racehorse rather than a former sitcom actor. While Bob-Waksberg successfully pushed for the show-business angle, this contributed to a storyline in which BoJack later played the titular racehorse in the fictional movie Secretariat in the show's second season.

Hanawalt was approached to come on board to design the show. She initially turned down the offer. "I'd just finished illustrating a children's book and it was kind of a bad experience. It took six months of work and felt endless, and I didn't want to commit to another big project. I made the mistake of not jumping aboard a good thing". Production went ahead with various other artists coming on board to design the show and characters, but none captured Hanawalt's unique style. Six months later, Hanawalt was again approached to design the show, and this time agreed. She then worked with animation production studio ShadowMachine to develop the show's visual style. The production team put together a brief pilot presentation of the show which was used to shop the show to networks.

Bob-Waksberg and the team eventually pitched to Netflix in October 2013, and the show was picked up on the condition that the series launch in time for summer 2014. As a result, the 12-episode first season was produced in just 35 weeks; the first three episodes were written by Bob-Waksberg before a full writing staff were hired, and the first table read was held in the first week of production. The original plan had been to use the footage from the original pilot presentation in the season's first episode; however, the decision was made to start from scratch (partially due to the decision to completely redesign the character of Todd Chavez from the way he appeared in the pilot).

The series premiered on August 22, 2014. Four days later, the series was renewed for a second season which released on July 17, 2015. A third season was announced July 28, 2015, and premiered July 22, 2016, with a fourth season announced the same day. The fourth season launched on Netflix on September 8, 2017. A fifth season was announced on September 21, 2017 and launched on September 14, 2018. Each season contained twelve episodes. Writers for BoJack Horseman included Bob-Waksberg, Joe Lawson, Kate Purdy, Elijah Aron, Jordan Young, Mehar Sethi and Joanna Calo. Directors include Amy Winfrey, J.C. Gonzalez, Mike Hollingsworth, Aaron Long and Anne Walker Farrell.

The show's first season intentionally told a self-contained story in case the show was not picked up for a second season. Netflix asked Bob-Waksberg to leave some threads hanging to set up a potential second season, and Bob-Waksberg asked that, should BoJack Horseman get canceled, Netflix warn him in advance so he could end the series properly. After the release of the fifth season, Netflix told Bob-Waksberg that the upcoming sixth season would be the show's last. "They don't have to do that, obviously. But I said I would appreciate it if I could have the forewarning to give the show a proper finale, and not set up some cliffhangers that will never pay off. So when they picked up season six, they said, 'Hey, remember how you asked for that heads-up? We think that this is your heads-up.' So I'm very grateful that we got that notice." An extended sixth and final season of sixteen episodes was announced on October 30, 2018, and released in two parts of eight episodes each. The first half released on October 25, 2019, and the second on January 31, 2020.

=== Casting ===
"I was presented with a seven-or-nine-page written spec treatment. I didn't see any animation for it; I just heard sort of the broad strokes of what the show was about. And I read it, and I loved it, instantly, of course. The world, the setting, you know? In Hollywood, in the industry, where animals and humans co-exist, and there's nothing weird about it. It's just how it is. And I read it and I thought it was just so smart. Raphael explained to me that he wanted to not only do a cartoon that was funny, but also a cartoon that was incredibly tragic at times. I thought that was such a brave, cool idea."

— Aaron Paul, about signing on to play Todd Chavez in BoJack Horseman

Will Arnett, Amy Sedaris, and Aaron Paul were the first actors to be cast for the show as BoJack Horseman, Princess Carolyn, and Todd Chavez, respectively, landing their roles ahead of the show's pilot presentation, with the remaining cast brought on board after Netflix picked up the show.

Arnett and Paul also served as executive producers on the show. The character of BoJack was not written with any particular actor in mind. Bob-Waksberg cast Arnett because he was: "so funny, but there's also a darkness to him... I feel like, in his gravelly performance, you feel like he's lived a life. And there's a sadness lurking underneath there. But again, he's so funny... He took our dumbest stuff and spun it into gold."

Arnett also provided the role of BoJack's father, Butterscotch Horseman, as well as the voice of a younger BoJack in flashback sequences. Amy Sedaris signed on to the series as she wanted to work with Arnett.

Following Netflix's acquisition of the series, Paul F. Tompkins was cast as BoJack's sitcom rival Mr. Peanutbutter. When Bob-Waksberg was originally writing Mr. Peanutbutter, he originally imagined him as being a "meat-head" with a deep voice, but the casting of Arnett as BoJack and Paul as Todd caused the casting team to go in a different direction with the character. Tompkins brought a "beautiful, lilting quality" to the role, with Bob-Waksberg describing his performance as: "skipping above the line, which as a foil to BoJack is very funny. BoJack, even in his voice, is very sunk down and in the muck, whereas Mr. Peanutbutter is playfully skipping above the muck."

Alison Brie was cast as Diane Nguyen, a ghostwriter hired to write BoJack's memoir and later ends up marrying Mr. Peanutbutter. As the show grew in popularity, Brie's casting as a Vietnamese-American character was met with controversy and accusations of white-washing. Bob-Waksberg later commented on the controversy, applauding Brie's performance of the character while expressing regret and that he believed the casting had "hurt the show":

"So that’s why I soured on the term “color-blind,” because I felt like I was being color-blind. I was just casting whoever was great and I wasn’t really thinking about their race, and then I was surprised to discover all the people I thought were great were white people."

=== Influences ===
Creator Raphael Bob-Waksberg has cited the cynical humor in the Canadian show The Newsroom as a large influence on BoJack Horseman. He also praised The Simpsons as an influence for being able to tell sad stories without sacrificing humor. Based on storyline similarities and graphical nuances, the series has been said to have influences deriving from Californication, Two and a Half Men, and Daria. Bob-Waksberg has quoted Philip Larkin's poem "This Be The Verse" as an influence, saying "I think [this poem] is always in the back of my head, certainly for these characters [of Bojack's family]." In September 2018, before the show's fifth season was released, Bob-Waksberg stated that the show's ten biggest influences were The Simpsons, Who Framed Roger Rabbit, Archer, Animaniacs, Daria, The Tick, Pixar Animation Studios, Futurama, South Park, and the works of Don Hertzfeldt.

=== Music ===
The main title theme for BoJack Horseman was composed by Patrick Carney, drummer for the blues-rock duo the Black Keys, with his uncle Ralph Carney, and the ending theme "Back in the 90s (BoJack's Theme)" was performed by the indie-pop act Grouplove. The incidental music is composed by Jesse Novak who acted as the recurring composer for the six seasons.

The soundtrack for BoJack Horseman was released on Lakeshore Records on September 1, 2017. It includes several songs, among them the full version of the main theme, Patrick Carney and Michelle Branch's version of America's "A Horse with No Name", Sextina Aquafina's "Get Dat Fetus, Kill Dat Fetus", the themes from Horsin' Around and Mr. Peanutbutter's House, and the entire score for the episode "Fish Out of Water".

== Themes ==
Since its first season, BoJack has addressed many "hot-button" sociopolitical issues. Its creator, Raphael Bob-Waksberg, once said that he considered the concept of "political correctness" something that other comedians and media creators should view as more of a responsibility. In a 2017 interview with Vice, he said:

I think most people who argue for what you might call political correctness, are not actually arguing for censorship. They're arguing for self-control and self-restraint. They're arguing for people to be conscious of the power they have, right? And I believe that I have a lot of power, as someone making popular entertainment. I do think we have to be careful about the art we put out.

A notable example is the episode "Hank After Dark" (season two, episode seven), commonly referred to as "the Cosby episode," which follows Diane and BoJack on a book tour as they field questions regarding allegations (the specificities of which are never stated) that have just surfaced about a comedy legend, Hank Hippopopalous. In the episode "Brrap Brrap Pew Pew" (season three, episode six), Diane accidentally announces she is getting an abortion via pop starlet Sextina Aquafina's Twitter account, and Hollywoo gets swept up in talks about the practice. The season four episode, "Thoughts and Prayers," took a similar satirical approach towards the frequency of mass shootings and the gun debate in America, after Diane fires a gun for the first time, and one of Princess Carolyn's projects get caught in the crossfire, launching a debate on whether or not women should own and use guns.

The fifth season has been praised for its handling of sexual harassment and powerful men following the #MeToo movement. Emily St. James wrote that it "just might be the best artistic rumination on #MeToo and an age of terrible men yet."

The show also explores Todd Chavez's open asexuality, which is addressed throughout the latter three seasons. In the last episode of the third season, Todd says, "I'm not gay... I mean, I don't think I am, but I don't think I'm straight, either. I don't know what I am. I think I might be nothing." In season 6, Todd forms a relationship with Maude, a rabbit he meets on the asexual dating app he created, "All About That Ace." Sarah E. S. Sinwell and Danielle Girard analyze Todd’s asexuality, arguing his complex character helps challenge heteronormative norms on television.

=== Absurdism ===
The series often involves existential, nihilistic, or even absurdist tones in its themes. The series has been interpreted as reflecting the idea that all life is just a "meaningless struggle to find a purpose in life." The series consistently emphasizes a lack of meaning or a happy resolution, showing its characters searching for a purpose to eventually never find one, portraying the world as a meaningless and irrational place.

The narrative frequently ignores having a satisfying ending. BoJack declares in season 1 that "Closure is a made up thing by Steven Spielberg... It doesn't exist in the real world. The only thing to do now is just to keep living forward." Repeatedly claiming that closure isn't an achievable goal. This view aligns with BoJack's regular nihilism, even broaching on absurdism.

Cynicism and dark humor are often used to emphasize these themes. Characters frequently try to find a meaning in a world that's uncaring, trying to find fulfillment from an objective meaning without any payoff, being called "a chase after meaning". Balancing these elements with scenes of honesty and vulnerability, showing the ongoing strife between everyone's search for a real purpose.

== Critical reception ==
Season	Critical response	
Season	Rotten Tomatoes	Metacritic
1	71% (28 reviews)	59/100 (13 reviews)
2	100% (22 reviews)	90/100 (7 reviews)
3	100% (31 reviews)	89/100 (12 reviews)
4	97% (35 reviews)	87/100 (5 reviews)
5	98% (48 reviews)	92/100 (6 reviews)
6	96% (55 reviews)	93/100 (6 reviews)
6	96% (55 reviews)	91/100 (8 reviews)
Average	93%	82/100

Initially met with mixed reviews from critics, the series would quickly go on to receive consistent critical acclaim midway into season one and onwards during its run for its existential plot lines and realistic take on depression, drug addiction, alcoholism, and celebrity status. Its ensemble cast has been praised for their voice performances.

=== Season 1 ===
On the review aggregator website Rotten Tomatoes, the first season has an approval rating of 71% with an average rating of 5.9/10 based on 28 reviews. The website's critics consensus is, "It's intermittently funny, but in most respects, BoJack Horseman pales in comparison to similar comedies." On Metacritic, the season received a score of 59 out of 100, based on 13 critics, indicating "mixed or average reviews". Erik Adams' review of the first six episodes gave the series a C+ grade; in the review, Adams wrote that the show "spoofs the emptiness of celebrity, but does so without any novelty or true insight". Willa Paskin, writing for Slate, was more enthused. "[It] is perhaps a little more clever than it is uproariously funny, but it is often very clever, and, moreover, well-tuned to the ludicrousness of the sort of low-level fame that surrounds BoJack". She likened it to 30 Rock in its ability to "[present] big ideas without having to commit to them". Chris Mitchell of Popzara was equally optimistic about the show's future, saying that "Fans of FX's Archer or Fox's Bob's Burgers will definitely want to check this one out, as its rapid-fire delivery is always consciously spot-on". The New York Times described the show as "hilarious and ribald". Margaret Lyons of Vulture gave a positive review, describing it as "radically sad. I love it."

The second half of the season, however, received much more positive reviews. Ben Travers of IndieWire believed one possible reason for mixed reviews of the show was critics reviewing only the first half of the season, with the second half changing drastically in tone and developing a darker and deeper meaning. This change was so drastic that it led to IndieWire changing its policy to only review entire seasons of shows on Netflix, instead of just the first six episodes, which would have boosted BoJack Horseman's C+ grade.

Keith Uhlich of The A.V. Club named the first season of BoJack Horseman the fourth-best motion picture of 2014.

=== Season 2 ===
The second season received universal acclaim. On Rotten Tomatoes, the second season holds an approval rating of 100% with an average rating of 8.7/10 based on 22 critics. The website's critics consensus is, "Bojack Horseman truly comes into its own during season two, maturing into an ambitious comedy that sensitively blends wackiness with dark, nuanced drama." On Metacritic, the season has a score of 90 out of 100, based on 7 critics. Emily St. James of Vox wrote that the show had "found its footing beautifully in season two, earning the title of not just the streaming service's best show, but of one of television's best shows". Liz Shannon Miller of IndieWire gave the series a grade of "A−", praising the depth of the show's storyline, the voice cast and the superior comedy in comparison to the first season. Vikram Murthi of The A.V. Club also gave the series an "A−", commenting that "for the most part, it's an entirely unique, funny, and melancholic exploration into the heart and mind of someone struggling to put his life back on track after a series of dark turns".

Chuck Bowen of Slant Magazine awarded the series four-and-a-half stars out of five, commenting that "BoJack Horseman's second season is an even more confident blend of the various tones it experimentally donned last year, as it's simultaneously melancholic, angry, goofy, playful, and often uproariously funny in a distinctively ineffable what-the-fuck fashion". Entertainment Weekly gave the series a B rating, stating it was "one of TV's best meta-skewers of Hollywood".

=== Season 3 ===
The third season received near-universal acclaim. On Rotten Tomatoes, the third season has an approval rating of 100% with average rating of 9.1 based on 31 reviews. The website's critics consensus is, "Skillfully puncturing the idea of celebrity and our culture's bizarre obsession with it, BoJack Horseman's third season continues its streak as one of the funniest and most heartbreaking shows on television." On Metacritic, the season received a score of 89 out of 100, based on 12 reviews. Daniel Fienberg of The Hollywood Reporter lauded the season, commenting that the show "evolved from frothy talking-animal Hollywood satire to character-rich treatise on depression in its first season, deepened and darkened into one of TV's best shows in its second season and gallops into its third season with a profound confidence". Entertainment Weekly gave the series an A rating, stating the season is "more digressive than the show's first two years, and much more open-ended, sending core characters in different directions" and that it "builds to one of the funniest, weirdest, and most profound moments ever seen in a television show".

The A.V. Club awarded the series an A−, commenting that "Netflix has taken it upon itself to add BoJack to the line of TV's famous antiheroes" and praising the show for improving with each series. Chris Cabin of Collider gave the show four out of five stars, stating "BoJack Horseman ends up becoming a thrilling, rueful study of the psychological games and uniquely vain, notably capitalistic decision-making that powers the entertainment industry". They went on to praise the show's humor; "through its venomous jokes and unrelenting, uproarious gags, the series also recognizes how charming, joyful, and galvanizing entertainment for entertainment sake can be, no matter how stupid or silly it may seem".

=== Season 4 ===
The fourth season also received wide acclaim. On Rotten Tomatoes, the season holds a 97% approval rating with an average rating of 8.7/10 based on 35 reviews. The website's critics consensus is, "BoJack Horseman's fourth season finds the show continuing to fearlessly traverse the emotional gamut - with results that are heartbreaking as often as they are hilarious." Metacritic awarded the show a score of 87 out of 100 based on 5 reviews. Liz Shannon Miller of IndieWire gave the series an "A" grade, commenting that "by the end of the season, we know these characters, and this show, far better than ever before. BoJack's signature tropes—the background visual jokes, the animal puns, the brutal moments of sadness—remain reliably consistent, but turns the focus largely inward, ensuring that some of the more outlandish plots support and highlight the more emotional storylines".

Bethonie Butler of The Washington Post lauded the series, praising the installment as "moving and unexpected" and that "it offers hope but never ignores the sorrows that are inevitable in real life". Mike Hale of The New York Times also gave a positive review, commenting that the "material has the snap and the poignancy we've grown accustomed to" and that "while nothing matches the adventurousness of season three's underwater film festival episode, season four's ninth episode—narrated from the future by a distant descendant of Princess Carolyn's—is a devastating example of what BoJack can do at its best".

=== Season 5 ===
Keeping up with the performance of previous seasons, the fifth season received widespread acclaim. Based on 48 reviews, the season has an approval rating of 98% with average rating of 9.3/10 on Rotten Tomatoes. The website's critics consensus is, "BoJack Horseman continues confidently down the thematic rabbit hole with a fresh and poignant season that's as devastating as it is hilarious." On Metacritic, it holds a score of 92 out of 100 based on 6 reviews. IndieWire gave the season an "A" calling it another brilliant season and saying the series has become so great that it is "beyond reproach". Multiple critical reviews have praised the episode "Free Churro", calling it one of the series' best episodes and giving it Emmy buzz for both the writing and Will Arnett's monologue. Les Chappell of The A.V. Club observed that the episode "The Dog Days Are Over", in which Diane Nguyen takes an impromptu trip to Hanoi, can be seen as a commentary on the "identity crisis elements" of having the Vietnamese-American character Diane voiced by a white actress.

=== Season 6 ===
The sixth season has also received wide acclaim. On Rotten Tomatoes, the season holds a 96% approval rating with an average rating of 9.2/10 based on 55 reviews, with a critics' consensus that reads: "Bittersweet and brilliant to the very end, BoJack Horseman's final season manages to keep surprising viewers with its empathy and depth, solidifying its place as one of TV's greatest offerings." On Metacritic, the first part of season six holds a score of 93 out of 100 based on 6 reviews, while the second part holds a score of 91 out of 100 based on eight reviews. Jen Chaney of Vulture called it "more clever, intelligent, and multilayered than 95 percent of comedies on television or any other platform".

=== Awards and nominations ===
Throughout its run, BoJack Horseman has received numerous accolades, including two Saturn Award nominations for Best Animated Series on Television, four Critics' Choice Television Awards for Best Animated Series, and two Creative Arts Emmy Award nominations for Outstanding Animated Program. For her voicing of Sarah Lynn, Kristen Schaal was nominated for the Primetime Emmy Award for Outstanding Character Voice-Over Performance. Additionally, writers on the show received a total of seven nominations from the Writers Guild of America, three of which were won by Joe Lawson for "Stop the Presses", Kate Purdy for "Time's Arrow", and Nick Adams for "Xerox of a Xerox".

=== Legacy ===
BoJack Horseman has been considered by multiple critics to be one of the best animated shows of all time.

- It was ranked as the best Netflix original series of all time by Thrillist and Uproxx in August 2018 and May 2019, respectively.
- IndieWire, in November 2018, named BoJack Horseman as the best animated series of all time.
- It was also ranked as one of the best TV shows of the 2010s by multiple publications, including Time and Vanity Fair and, following the premiere of the first half of season six in 2019, Chris Mandle of the BBC declared BoJack Horseman "the 21st Century's best animation".
- Rolling Stone labeled BoJack Horseman the fourth-best TV series of the 2010s and GQ also listed the series as one of the best of the decade and "the benchmark by which all comedies of the decade can be judged".
- In 2021, the BBC ranked the series #11, the highest-ranking animated show, on its list of the 100 greatest TV series of the 21st Century.
- In 2023, BoJack Horseman was ranked #14 of the best TV series in the last 25 years by critics in a poll conveyed by Rotten Tomatoes, making it the only animated series to be included in the list.
- In 2026, The New York Times ranked BoJack Horseman #44 on its list of the 100 Best TV Shows of the 21st Century.

BoJack Horseman has contributed to the rise of the "sadcom", a tragicomic format that balances both humor and sadness.

== Release ==
=== Syndication ===
On July 26, 2018, Comedy Central acquired exclusive linear television syndication rights to BoJack Horseman; making it the first Netflix original to be syndicated to cable television in the United States. The series debuted on September 26, 2018, following the South Park season 22 premiere. In February 2021, BoJack Horseman re-aired on MTV2.

In the United Kingdom, the show began airing on DMAX on February 25, 2019.

=== Home media ===
On December 13, 2018, The Tornante Company and Shout! Factory announced a deal to release the first four seasons on DVD and Blu-ray. In North America, a bundle of the first two seasons and the Christmas special was released on DVD and Blu-ray on July 30, 2019; this release also contains animatics, art galleries and audio commentaries as bonus features. In the United Kingdom, Manga Entertainment released season one on October 28, 2019, followed by season two on December 2, respectively. However, the remaining four seasons have yet to be released on home media.
