= Nick Adams (writer) =

American television writer and author

Nick Adams is an American television writer and producer who is known for his work on the shows New Girl, BoJack Horseman and black·ish. He is a Writers Guild of America Award winner and Primetime Emmy Awards nominee.

Adams is also the author of the book Making Friends with Black People, a non-fiction humor book to help white people "avoid potential racial pitfalls." Adams lives in Los Angeles, California and is a member of the Los Angeles chapter of the Democratic Socialists of America.
