= Hisko Hulsing =

Dutch director

- Born: 7 July 1971 (age 54); Amsterdam, Netherlands
- Occupations: Director; Animator; Painter; Composer; Storyboard Artist
- Known for: Kurt Cobain: Montage of Heck (directed by Brett Morgen, 2015); Junkyard (2012); Seventeen (2004); Undone

Hisko Hulsing (born 7 July 1971 in Amsterdam) is a Dutch director, animator, composer, painter and storyboard artist.

His animated films have won many awards, including the Grand Prize for Junkyard at the Ottawa International Animation Film Festival and the Grand Prize at the Shanghai Television Festival.

Hisko Hulsing's film Junkyard had its online release in 2014 on Vimeo and was chosen as Top Ten video 2014 by Vimeo Staff, Vice USA and SOTW.

Hisko Hulsing composes the orchestral soundtracks for his animated films.

In 2014 Hisko Hulsing Studio animated large sequences for Kurt Cobain: Montage of Heck, the first authorized documentary about Kurt Cobain, directed by Brett Morgen. The film premiered at the Sundance Film Festival and was theatrically released by Universal Pictures worldwide. HBO and Netflix broadcast Kurt Cobain: Montage of Heck in 2015.

Hulsing directed and production designed Amazon's first adult animated series, Undone, which was created by Kate Purdy and Raphael Bob-Waksberg for Michael Eisner's company Tornante. It premiered on 13 September 2019 on Amazon Prime Video.

== Filmography ==
- Harry Rents a Room (1999)
- Seventeen (2004)
- MTV - Son of the Blob (2005)
- Junkyard (2012)
- The Last Hijack (directed by Tommy Pallotta, 2014)
- Kurt Cobain: Montage of Heck (directed by Brett Morgen, 2015)
- Undone (2019)
- The Sandman: "Dream of a Thousand Cats" (2022)
