= The Exquisite Corpse Project =

- Directed by: Ben Popik
- Written by: Chioke Nassor; Joel Clark; Adam Conover; Dave Segal; Raphael Bob-Waksberg
- Produced by: Margaret Laney; Ben Popik; Joanna Popik; Marshall Rimmer
- Edited by: Raphael Bob-Waksberg
- Music by: Jesse Novak
- Release date: June 2, 2012 (Dances With Films Festival)
- Country: United States
- Language: English

The Exquisite Corpse Project is a 2012 crossover comedy/documentary from director Ben Popik and the comedy group Olde English. In the film, Popik challenges five comedy writers to each write a fifth of a film, with the constraint that each writer can only read the previous five pages of the script before writing their section. The final film is a combination of the movie written by the writers, and a documentary about the argument-provoking writing process.

== Title and structure ==
The film takes its title from a Surrealist parlor game called Exquisite Corpse, in which a group of artists complete a drawing in sections with each artist having almost no idea what the other artists have contributed.

The structure of the film is true to that concept—each writer writes a fifth of the movie, but is only allowed to read the previous five pages of the script. Accordingly, while the second writer is allowed to read pages 11–15 of the script, the fifth writer is only allowed to read pages 56–60 before writing the final section of the film. Additionally, Popik filmed interviews at every stage of the process, beginning with the initial assignment of the challenge, and snippets of those interviews are used to provide comedic commentary on the film. According to the review in Film Threat, "It’s like having all the special features of a DVD playing at the same time as the movie, only instead of being a distraction it enhances the experience."

== Writers ==
The film was written by Olde English Comedy members Raphael Bob-Waksberg, Dave Segal, and Adam Conover—as well as former member Joel Clark and OE collaborator Chioke Nassor. The order of the writers was chosen randomly, and each writer was given a week to write their 15-page section. Since the movie is one-third documentary, the writers themselves are major characters in the film.

== Cast ==
The film stars Olde English comedy member Caleb Bark, as well as a number of longtime OE collaborators including actress Julia Frey.

- Caleb Bark as Marc
- Megan Raye Manzi as Adayit/Meg
- Julia Frey as Stephanie
- Trevor Williams as Yustus
- Tavon Bolourchi as Todd
- Geoff Lee as Mr. Kim

== Accolades ==
Since its festival premiere in June 2012 at Dances With Films, the film has won the following awards:

Award	Festival
Audience Choice	Dances With Films
Best Documentary	LA New Wave Film Festival
Best Director	LA New Wave Film Festival
Best Feature Narrative	Annapolis Film Festival
