= The View from Halfway Down =

- BoJack Horseman episode
- BoJack attends a dinner party, referencing The Last Supper; due to the complexities of staging the scene, each individual character was assigned a separate storyboard artist
- Episode no.: Season 6 Episode 15
- Directed by: Amy Winfrey
- Written by: Alison Tafel
- Original release date: January 31, 2020
- Running time: 26 minutes

Guest appearances
- Zach Braff as Famous Actor Zach Braff; Brandon T. Jackson as Corduroy Jackson-Jackson; Wendie Malick as Beatrice Horseman; Lin-Manuel Miranda as Crackerjack Sugarman; Kristen Schaal as Sarah Lynn; Stanley Tucci as Herb Kazzaz

Episode chronology
← Previous "Angela"	Next → "Nice While It Lasted"
- BoJack Horseman (season 6)

"The View from Halfway Down" is the fifteenth episode of the sixth and final season of the American animated television series BoJack Horseman, and the 75th and penultimate episode of the series overall. Written by Alison Tafel and directed by Amy Winfrey, the episode was released on Netflix on January 31, 2020, alongside the other episodes of the sixth season's second half. Guest stars include Stanley Tucci, Kristen Schaal, Wendie Malick, Lin-Manuel Miranda, Brandon T. Jackson, and Zach Braff.

In the episode, BoJack Horseman (Will Arnett) attends a dinner party and talent show hosted by his late mother Beatrice (Malick) and attended by various other characters that have died during the series, including his former Horsin' Around co-star Sarah Lynn (Schaal), his best friend Herb Kazzaz (Tucci), and a combination of his father Butterscotch and his childhood role-model Secretariat (Arnett). Partway into the episode, BoJack realizes that he is trapped in a dying nightmare as his real self drowns in his swimming pool.

"The View from Halfway Down" received widespread acclaim, with praise for its ambitious concept, dark and serious tone, and function as the culmination of the title character's story. It was nominated for the Primetime Emmy Award for Outstanding Animated Program.

== Plot ==
A young Beatrice Horseman welcomes her son BoJack and a child-aged Sarah Lynn to a dinner party attended by Herb Kazzaz, Crackerjack Sugarman, Corduroy Jackson-Jackson, and Zach Braff, all of whom had died earlier in the series. (Note: Throughout the series: Secretariat jumped off a bridge in a flashback during the season 1 episode "Later".; Herb was mentioned to have died of his nut allergy after crashing into a truck carrying peanuts in the season 2 episode "Still Broken".; Corduroy died from auto-erotic asphyxiation in the season 2 episode "Higher Love".; Sarah Lynn died of a heroin overdose in the season 3 episode "That's Too Much, Man!".; Crackerjack was mentioned to have died fighting in World War II in a flashback in the season 4 episode "The Old Sugarman Place".; Butterscotch's funeral featured in the season 4 episode "Thoughts and Prayers".; Zach Braff was burnt alive in the season 4 episode "Underground".; Beatrice's funeral was the subject of the season 5 episode "Free Churro".) The guests take turns discussing their lives and deaths over dinner, while a mysterious black liquid drips onto BoJack from the ceiling. Towards the end of the dinner, BoJack vomits the liquid onto the table. The guests are eventually joined by BoJack's father Butterscotch, who has assumed the form of BoJack's childhood idol Secretariat.

Beatrice invites the guests to an after-dinner show, which BoJack recognizes as the point at which he always wakes up from this recurring dream. (Note: BoJack's fellow therapy horse Dr. Champ previously reminded him of this dream in the season 6 episode "A Little Uneven, Is All".) This time, however, the dream does not end; he enters the theater next door, where Herb hosts a talent show. Each guest performs a routine reflecting their views on life, then disappears through a white door in the center of the stage. As they perform, BoJack begins to remember details of his drinking binge from the previous episode, including a call to Diane.

Outside, Butterscotch and BoJack smoke together and achieve a form of closure. BoJack sees the outline of his body floating face-down in the swimming pool of his Los Angeles mansion. He maintains that he climbed out of the pool and called Diane during his drinking binge, and thus cannot be drowning. Butterscotch performs a poem titled "The View from Halfway Down", in which he (as Secretariat) recalls his suicide and expresses the panicked regret he felt as he jumped from a bridge, while the white door moves incrementally closer. BoJack is unable to leave the theater, and Herb tells him that he cannot save himself now, as this is all happening in his mind.

Eventually, only BoJack and Herb remain. The black liquid begins emerging from the door and envelops Herb, who tells BoJack that there is no "other side". Horrified, BoJack flees from the black liquid and finds a landline phone in the kitchen. He calls Diane, who responds that she left Los Angeles for Chicago and cannot help him. BoJack remembers that the call he made to Diane actually went to voicemail, and he subsequently went back into the pool. Diane agrees to stay on the phone until the black liquid consumes BoJack.

Instead of the usual closing theme song, the episode ends with the sound of a flatlining heart monitor; however, when the credits finish, the monitor begins beeping normally.

== Production ==
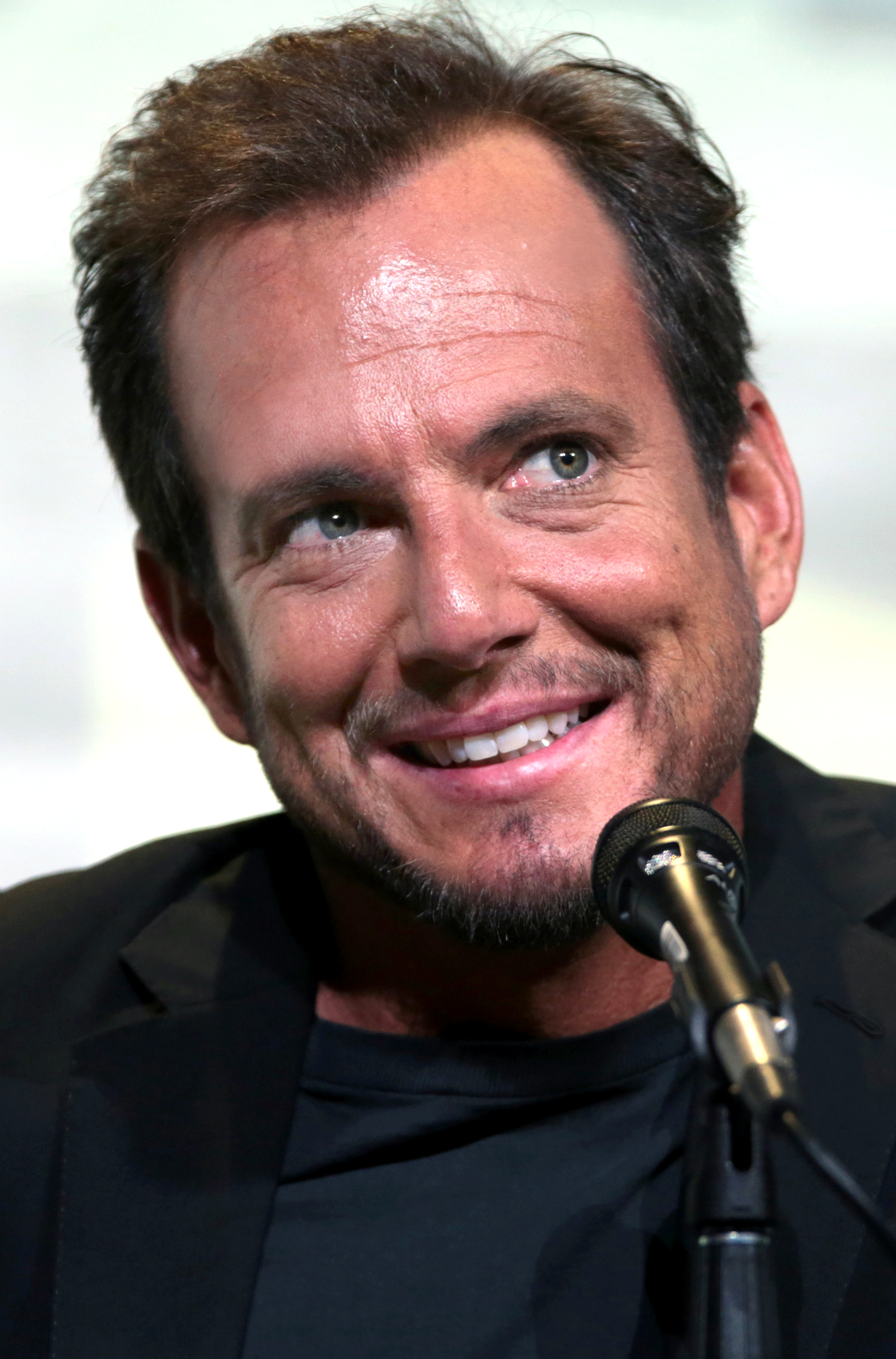
Will Arnett voiced both BoJack Horseman and his father Butterscotch.

"The View from Halfway Down" was written by Alison Tafel, who previously wrote the episodes "Stupid Piece of Sh*t", "INT. SUB", and "Feel-Good Story". The episode was directed by Amy Winfrey, her 21st across all six seasons. "The View from Halfway Down" was originally released for streaming on Netflix on January 31, 2020, as the fifteenth episode of the show's sixth season and the 76th overall episode of the series.

Series creator Raphael Bob-Waksberg had wanted to do a "dinner party with everyone who had gone" episode of BoJack Horseman prior to production of the show's sixth season. As work on the season progressed, the central concept changed from a dream sequence to an exploration of limbo, at which point Tafel says the episode "burst open". Bob-Waksberg cites the 1979 film All That Jazz as his primary inspiration for the episode. In the film, when protagonist Joe Gideon goes on life support after coronary artery bypass surgery, he experiences a series of extravagant dream sequences featuring loved ones from his past. Other influences included the Caryl Churchill play Top Girls, in which protagonist Marlene has a dinner party with famous women of history; and Edward Albee's play Three Tall Women, in which three iterations of the same woman reflect on her life.

The Victorian house in which the episode takes place was created by production designer Lisa Hanawalt. In directing the action, Winfrey was inspired by The Cabinet of Dr. Caligari to "put in a lot of wonky angles" in the kitchen, which was a combination of BoJack's childhood kitchen, the one in his house, and the set on his breakout acting role, Horsin' Around. Each character was assigned a different storyboard artist during the dining-room scene, with assistant director Chris Nance assigned to BoJack. While Tafel wrote brief descriptions of each talent-show act into the script, Winfrey and the animators were largely free to design the details of each performance themselves.

The episode's title derived from Bob-Waksberg's desire to have at least one episode title beginning with each letter of the alphabet. By the time they reached the penultimate episode, the only letter remaining was "V". In-episode, "The View from Halfway Down" is the name of the poem that Butterscotch/Secretariat reads, in which he expresses regret over his suicide by jumping. The decision to combine the characters of Butterscotch, BoJack's biological father, with his childhood idol Secretariat, was meant to reflect "the father you wish you had versus the father you had". Originally, Will Arnett (the voice of BoJack and Butterscotch Horseman) and John Krasinski (the voice of Secretariat) were meant to alternate the character's lines but, after hearing Arnett read the poem, Bob-Waksberg decided not to bring in Krasinski.

"The View from Halfway Down" contains several callbacks to previous episodes. For instance, the meals served at the dinner party reflect what killed them in life, such as Herb Kazzaz's peanut allergy, or the lemon that Corduroy Jackson-Jackson was biting while performing autoerotic asphyxiation. Most notably, perhaps, BoJack's apparent death reflects the series' recurring motif of swimming and drowning, which appears not only within the show but during the title sequence, when BoJack falls into his own pool. Bob-Waksberg and the creative team said that, while "it felt as though we'd been setting it up all along", it was only later that the creative team felt that it would be a "really appropriate culmination" to have BoJack drown in his pool. Originally, the episode was meant to end with BoJack waking up from his near-death experience, but Bob-Waksberg decided not "to break the reality of this episode", instead leaving the ending ambiguous. Although there has been some speculation that BoJack dies at the end of "The View from Halfway Down", with the series finale "Nice While It Lasted" serving as a dream sequence, Bob-Waksberg insists that the creative team never seriously considered killing the title character.

== Reception ==
=== Critical reception ===
"The View from Halfway Down" received widespread critical acclaim, with Ed Cumming of The Independent calling it a "tour-de-force", Alan Sepinwall of Rolling Stone describing it as "amazing", and Emily VanDerWerff of Vox ambiguously referring to it as "something else". Dave Trumbor of Collider singled out "The View from Halfway Down" as "the best episode overall of this season", and Dan Di Placido of Forbes referred to the episode as "the highlight of the final season", while Taryn Allen of Chicago Reader went further, declaring it "one of the best – potentially the best – episodes of the entire series". Reviews largely targeted the episode's function as a culmination of BoJack Horseman's story. The A.V. Club's Les Chapell gave the episode an "A" grade, stating that "The View from Halfway Down" "[slots] firmly in the pantheon of A-grade BoJack Horseman penultimate installments [...] [and] continues that second-to-last episode trend of impossibly finding a darker place to take the series, and it takes BoJack right with it". Erin Qualey of Slate praised how the episode "illustrates that harboring unresolved trauma can be deadly and, in doing so, brings viewers to that dark yet somehow hopeful place that's long been a hallmark of the series". In a more critical assessment of the episode, however, Ben Travers of IndieWire believed that "The View from Halfway Down" did not sufficiently move the series forward, and that "the summation of the episode didn't feel like the best use of the series' little remaining time".

Several reviews of the second half of season six, which debuted in full on Netflix on January 31, compared "The View from Halfway Down" with the comparatively lighter "Nice While It Lasted". Travers' review described how "Episode 15 feels like 'BoJack Horseman: The Drama' while the start of Episode 16 feels like 'BoJack Horseman: The Sitcom.'" Vanity Fair's Tara Ariano referred to the episode as "destined-to-be-divisive", while Joshua Rivera of The Verge contrasted the way that BoJack's guilt is "only alluded to" in the finale, but "explicitly given its due" in "The View from Halfway Down". VanDerWerff mentioned that she was "sure some will wish the series had let BoJack stay dead", while Jake Kleinman of Inverse declared the penultimate episode "a pitch-perfect ending", and stated that, "If this was the last episode of BoJack, it would have given the show a perfect, haunting farewell."

=== Accolades ===
"The View from Halfway Down" appeared on several publications' lists of the best television episodes of 2020. Christian Holub of Entertainment Weekly said that the episode "showed off the show's excellent animation as well as its uncompromising attitude towards exploring its characters' failings". Steve Greene of IndieWire called it "one of the best representations of dream logic ever put on screen: a jumbled mess of firing synapses that somehow manages to fit together into a coherent flow of its own making", while Joe Poniewozik of The New York Times described the dinner party as "revelatory and haunting".

On July 28, 2020, "The View from Halfway Down" was nominated for Outstanding Animated Program at the 72nd Primetime Creative Arts Emmy Awards. At the September 19 ceremony, the episode lost to "The Vat of Acid Episode" from Rick and Morty. "The View from Halfway Down" was the second episode of BoJack Horseman to be nominated for Outstanding Animated Program, following "Free Churro" in 2019.
