= Long Story Short (TV series) =

American adult animated comedy-drama

- Release poster
- Genre: Adult animation; Animated sitcom; Comedy drama
- Created by: Raphael Bob-Waksberg
- Showrunner: Raphael Bob-Waksberg
- Starring: Ben Feldman; Angelique Cabral; Abbi Jacobson; Nicole Byer; Max Greenfield; Lisa Edelstein; Paul Reiser
- Music by: Jesse Novak
- Country of origin: United States
- Original language: English
- No. of seasons: 1
- No. of episodes: 10

Production
- Executive producers: Raphael Bob-Waksberg; Noel Bright; Steven A. Cohen
- Editors: Molly Yahr; Brian Swanson
- Running time: 25 minutes
- Production companies: The Tornante Company; Vegan Blintzes; ShadowMachine; Netflix Animation Studios

Original release
- Network: Netflix
- Release: August 22, 2025 – present

Long Story Short is an American adult animated comedy-drama television series that was created by Raphael Bob-Waksberg and premiered on Netflix on August 22, 2025. Before its premiere, it was renewed for a second season.

== Premise ==
Long Story Short is about a middle-class, Jewish family from California whose narrative is told in a non-linear fashion. The main characters are three siblings—Avi (Ben Feldman), Shira (Abbi Jacobson), and Yoshi (Max Greenfield)—who experience ordinary, adult events while looking back on their childhood.

== Voice cast ==
=== Main ===
- Ben Feldman as Avi Schwooper, the oldest of the Schwooper children. Born in 1982 and growing up in Mountain View, California with his siblings, Avi has extensive knowledge of pop culture and music; he works as a review columnist and, by 2021, for a music streaming service. Avi is grounded and witty, but also cynical and passive in conflict. Avi starts dating Jen in 2004, and they later marry and have a daughter named Hannah, residing in Santa Rosa, California. By the 2010s, their relationship begins to break down, and they divorce in 2020, sharing custody of the now-teenage Hannah. In his adult years, Avi distances himself from his Jewish religious heritage, and is shown to be unable to tell his family he loves them, rather saying "Hey…y’know?" to indicate it. Avi suffers from pattern hair loss.
- Angelique Cabral as Jen Schwooper, Avi's non-Jewish girlfriend and later wife, born in 1983. They begin dating in college by 2004 and marry and have Hannah by 2009. Jen and Avi divorced in 2020, due to their relationship gradually eroding, and Jen growing frustrated by Avi's passiveness and cynicism, along with Naomi's passive aggression toward her and undermining her and Avi's parenting, which Avi also failed to stand up to her for. Jen majored in acting, but after the stress of putting on several failed plays in New York with her friends, she secretly wished for a more regular job. Jen agrees to move to California after Avi is offered a music-journalism internship, though it is evident she is ashamed she gave up acting. While it’s implied she helps with the theatre at Hannah's school in 2014, by 2019 Jen becomes a lucrative wine salesperson. She’s generally kind and down to earth, and is shown being quite courteous to Avi’s family when she first meets them the weekend of Yoshi’s bar mitzvah, in spite of being overwhelmed by being thrust into their dysfunction and Jewish rituals she is unfamiliar with. She becomes snarkier as she gets older due to Avi and his family's dysfunction, though she remains on amicable speaking terms with him after their divorce. Unlike Avi, she seems to not be well versed in pop culture, not knowing or getting some of the media he shows or references to her.
- Abbi Jacobson as Shira Schwooper, the middle of the Schwooper children, and sole daughter of Naomi and Elliot. Born in August 1984, Shira is a lesbian and marries Kendra around 2013-14, with whom she raises twin boys, Walter and Benjamin, and lives in Oakland, California. Shira is blunt, sardonic, stubborn, and easily holds grudges, as on multiple occasions growing up she felt like her and her feelings were dismissed and overlooked, but she’s nonetheless still compassionate and loves her family, and has a loving healthy relationship with her wife. As a child, Shira was best friends with Rachel "Baby" Feldstein, and had a romantic relationship with Rachel in high school. However, after catching her making out with a man at prom, Shira discovers Rachel saw her as a mindless fling and feels betrayed and led-on, which ends their friendship. Shira cannot conceive children due to primary ovarian insufficiency, so Kendra bears the couple's children via IVF.
- Nicole Byer as Kendra Hooper, a lesbian and Shira's wife, who converts to Judaism as an adult after lying about being Jewish to cover up for a work absence during Rosh Hashanah. Born in 1982, Kendra is more grounded than her wife and loves her in spite of her stubborn tendencies. Kendra works as a senior manager for B.J Banana Fingers, a children's entertainment fast-food chain similar to Chuck E. Cheese. She gained her role due to her being a former workaholic who over-exerted herself—a habit she picked up from her father—after being accepted into a managerial training program when she was a floor manager. Kendra fired an employee who helped her as a child in order to gain a higher position by setting her up, which Kendra will have to live with. In the present, she is shown to have a healthy work/life balance and uses her position to help avoid layoffs. Kendra has a younger brother named David. She is from Oakland, California.
- Max Greenfield as Yoshi Schwooper, the youngest of the Schwooper children, and second son of Naomi and Elliot. Born in 1991, he is lackadaisical and somewhat socially awkward, but kind and laid-back. Yoshi, since infancy, has tried to connect and spend time with his siblings. However, being the youngest, with Avi and Shira being nine and seven years older respectively, he feels like an extra child. He grows up to be the Tallest in his familiy. As a teenager he was diagnosed with ADHD, dyslexia, and executive dysfunction, all of which cause him difficulties with managing a career in his adulthood. In 2014-2015 Yoshi interns on a farm in Vermont. By 2019, Yoshi starts practicing modern Orthodox Judaism, which helps him to find stability.
- Lisa Edelstein as Naomi Schwartz, the matriarch of the Schwooper family, and mother of Avi, Shira and Yoshi. Born in 1952, Naomi is the youngest of three daughters; they all grew up in a cramped New York apartment along with their parents. She showcases several narcissistic traits, as she is very self-centered and has a tendency to gain attention from her family by manipulating them. While Naomi loves her children, she is overbearing and critical, and her behavior has a deep effect on them. In 2019, her children confront Naomi about her controlling actions toward them. Naomi once worked as a social worker; to Avi's surprise, during a ceremony for her, it is revealed that Naomi has helped many people in the community, being more open-minded and supportive to strangers than her own children. In 2020, Naomi dies after contracting COVID-19.
- Paul Reiser as Elliot Cooper, a mathematics professor at Midbay University, is the patriarch of the Schwooper family, and father of Avi, Shira and Yoshi. Unlike Naomi, Elliot has unconditional love for the couple's children. He also has a tendency to be passive, usually not speaking over his much more domineering wife, and oblivious to the mood of a room when he walks in. He met Naomi in Golden Gate Park in 1976 while he was tripping on drugs and running around screaming; they marry in 1978 and buy a house and raise their children in Mountain View, California.

=== Recurring ===
- Dave Franco as Danny Wegbriet, Yoshi's shifty, stoner, childhood friend, who usually ends up making things worse when Yoshi turns to him for help. He notably wears some sort of new hat in each of his appearances.
- Michaela Dietz as Hannah Schwooper, Avi and Jen's daughter. Born in 2009, she is technically not Jewish as her mother is not and Avi did not raise her around the culture due to his own disassociation from religion. In middle school Hannah has a good relationship with her father and shares his interests but is isolated from children her own age, though she does find a friend group at the end of "Wolves". She is passionate about photography, and also has a strained relationship with Jen after her and her father divorce. She grows more interested in her Jewish heritage around this time as well, though fears she is not "Jewish enough" to do so.
- Gina Rodriguez as Rachel "Baby" Feldstein, Shira's bisexual childhood best friend. The two began secretly hooking up during their senior year of high school, with Shira genuinely having feelings for but Baby acting dodgey about having a conversation about their relationship. In 2002, Shira sneaks out of her mom’s JCC ceremony to prom to make things official but she catches Rachel kissing a boy. During their ensuring argument she discovers Rachel never saw their relationship as anything more than a mindless fling, and a heartbroken Shira angrily ends their relationship, though Rachel callously retorted back they never had anything, further devastating Shira. In 2015, Rachel reunites with Yoshi and they spend the night together catching up and later looking for his missing backpack. When asked about her falling out with Shira, Rachel, while looking a bit guilty, hastily says it was just teen stuff, but that Shira got mad for "no reason". She and Yoshi wind up ending their night in a make out session, which causes Yoshi to ejaculate and ruin his sperm sample for Kendra’s IVF treatment, and when Shira finds out Baby caused him to do so she becomes even more hurt and angry and cements her decision to use an anonymous donor.
- Danny Burstein as Uncle Barry, Naomi's boisterous, obnoxious uncle by marriage with her aunt Sylvia, the sister of Naomi's mother.
- Avia Fields as Walter and Benjamin Hooper-Schwooper, the hyperactive twin sons of Kendra and Shira, born in 2015 or 2016.
- Julie Klausner as Carol Schwartz, one of Naomi's older sisters.
- Zoe Lister-Jones as Susan Schwartz, one of Naomi's older sisters.

== Episodes ==
No.	Title	Directed by	Written by	Original release date	Prod. code
1	"Yoshi's Bar Mitzvah"	Katie Aldworth; Jack Shih	Raphael Bob-Waksberg	August 22, 2025	101
In 1996, the Schwooper family are traveling by car to the funeral of Naomi's mother. During the journey, Yoshi cannot stop poking at Shira, and Avi discusses with his parents the Jewish non-belief in the concept of Heaven as he attempts to cheer up his grieving mother. In 2004, on the weekend of Yoshi’s bar mitzvah Avi brings his girlfriend Jen to his childhood home to meet his seemingly dysfunctional family. Naomi acts stand-offish towards Jen by making passive-aggressive comments towards her. The conflict is only exacerbated when Jen gifts Naomi a vase, which Naomi complains about having to find something to put in it, and Jen uses the wrong sponge to wash some dishes that were kosher. Shira is angry over the fact her ex-best friend Baby Feldstein will be attending with her family. At the bar mitzvah, Shira finds out via Baby's parents that she did not come, which also angers her, claiming during her ranting that Yoshi will be upset. While smoking weed with him in a closet Yoshi has an existential crisis prior to the candle lighting ceremony after his friend Danny Wegbreit denounces the existence of God. The situation worsens when Jen is announced to light the last candle; a spot that had been reserved for Yoshi's Uncle Barry until Naomi changed the names on the call sheet. The ceremony ends with Naomi and Uncle Barry having a physical altercation as a flower arrangement burns down due to Naomi's interference with Jen lighting her candle. Naomi and Barry make amends and attempt to revitalize the party. After the bar mitzvah, Jen and Avi fly back and reaffirm their mutual affection. In 2022, as the episode ends, an older Avi sits alone in his car, with the Paul Simon song "The Obvious Child" playing.
2	"Hannah's Dance Recital"	Aaron Brewer	Kelly Galuska	August 22, 2025	104
In 1991, the siblings and Naomi are at Jersey Shore with Naomi's sister Susan and her sons. Avi and Shira play "lifeguard" until Avi's older cousins pressure him into playing with them instead, leaving Shira alone in the water. In 2014, Shira and her wife Kendra want to conceive a child. While attending a Christmas pageant show starring Hannah, Avi and Jen's daughter, Shira asks Avi to donate his sperm, leading to an awkward falling out between the siblings where they argue throughout the venue. Shira ends up opening up about her traumas, including the time at the beach in 1991, where she reveals she almost drowned and had to be saved by a stranger after Avi left her alone. Avi does not take her trauma seriously. Shira also confronts him about his internalized antisemitism, where he reveals how suffocating he found practicing Judaism and learning about antisemitism as a whole was, and how he didn’t want to implement it on his wife and daughter, which Shira snarks that what he’s describing is trauma. Shira also berates Avi for not checking in regularly with her or the rest of the family. The two ultimately reconcile, with Avi promising to check in more, although Shira no longer wants Avi as her and Kendra's sperm donor and instead asks Yoshi, but does not tell Yoshi he was her second choice. Meanwhile, during the production, Jen is approached by Hannah's dance teacher, a homosexual French man by the name of Jean-Pierre, who asks for her help during the show. Jen helps make new costumes for the girls, as the previous ones were too big, where she talks about her days as a theatre actress and how she left it behind both due to Avi getting a job offer, which required the family to move to California, and her deep down longing for a more stable job, though Jen implies she is ashamed of abandoning her aspirations. After the show, Jean-Pierre tries to kiss her, and after she rejects him and he reveals he is actually American, straight and single. Back in the audience, Kendra, who was tasked with saving Avi, Shira and Jen's seats ends up trying to give two preteen girls relationship advice. When the girls brush Kendra off, she happily realizes that, as a mother, she would only be seen as such rather than for the color of her skin; something she had been insecure about at the start of the episode. After the show, Avi tells Jen he appreciates her and, in spite of them clearly being on the rocks earlier in the episode, ponders the idea of giving Hannah a sibling, to which Jen reacts awkwardly.
3	"There's a Mattress in There"	Ben Bjelajac	Jordan Young	August 22, 2025	103
In 2006, Naomi and Elliot learn of Yoshi's diagnoses of ADHD and executive dysfunction, and the psychologist reveals, in rare cases, they can be caused by cleaning a baby's pacifier by rubbing it on a shirt—to which Elliot sheepishly admits, infuriating Naomi. In 2013, after being dismissed from his latest job, Yoshi is due to attend a job interview for a factory set up by Naomi. On his way there, he meets a stranger with an expensive car who takes a liking to Yoshi. The man takes Yoshi to his startup business "TAMIT" (There's A Mattress In There), a company selling mattresses which deploy out of cans for convenience, and offers him a position. Yoshi buys hundreds of TAMIT cans to sell and initially does very poorly, causing Naomi to doubt him, although Elliot shows him support. Eventually, however, Yoshi is able to sell all of the cans taking up his family's garage. Naomi advises Yoshi to seek new opportunities, but Yoshi doubles down and requests Elliot, a professor, to set up a meeting between Yoshi and his university's dean so he can pitch selling TAMIT to college students. The meeting is successful and Yoshi tells 10,000 mattresses, but they are recalled when it is found the TAMIT cans randomly detonate, causing property damage and injuries whenever they do so. As Yoshi is removing the recalled mattresses out of his family's home, many of them go off, destroying much of the house in the process. Naomi, frustrated with Elliot's diehard support leading to the destruction of their home, leaves him to speak to Yoshi alone. The episode ends with Elliot and Yoshi sitting outside, where Elliot reassures Yoshi. He tells Yoshi he won't always understand him, but will always love him, through a metaphor about Bob Dylan. The two sit and watch as more mattress cans detonate in the distance, with carnage being heard around them.
4	"Shira Can't Cook"	Katie Rice	Mehar Sethi	August 22, 2025	102
In 2012, Shira meets Kendra Hooper at the supermarket after they argue over Kendra having too many items for the express lane. They find common ground when they discover they are both Jewish. In 2021, Shira and Kendra are preparing to enroll their twin boys, Walter and Ben, into elementary school. The two attend an open day at the prestigious Altman Academy and love it. Walter and Ben's potential teacher tells them there are only 12 slots left and invites them to attend an upcoming potluck. Despite being a poorly skilled cook, Shira plans to impress the administration of the upmarket school by cooking knishes, a meal the now-deceased Naomi used to make for Shira and her siblings. At the same time, Kendra is attempting to coordinate work meetings remotely, but is repeatedly disturbed by Walter and Ben without Shira's assistance. Shira is successful at making the knishes, but throws them out when they don't taste the same as her mother's. Shira calls Elliot, who brings Naomi's recipe and takes Walter and Ben to their soccer practice alongside Kendra. As Shira struggles to follow the recipe, Elliot tells Kendra about Naomi's cooking process and how she complained each time, intercut with Shira struggling in the same manner. Elliot says Naomi cooked knishes because Shira was a picky eater, but always ate the knishes, and that the struggle of cooking is part of the process as doing something hard shows your family that you love them. Shira then reads the last part of the recipe, where Naomi noted down to add more garlic as Shira liked the knishes that way. Shira finishes the knishes and is satisfied since they finally taste like her mother's. She goes to bed, only for Shira and Kendra's dog to destroy the knishes afterwards. Kendra then spends the entire night following the recipe and cooks them again without Shira knowing. The next day, they arrive at the potluck, only to immediately leave after Shira realizes it would be breaking COVID social distancing rules and decides to enrol Walter and Ben into another school. The episode ends with Shira, Kendra and the boys eating the knishes, with Kendra telling them Shira made them "with love", only for Walter to begin screaming that he wants pizza instead.
5	"Yoshi & Baby"	Katie Rice	Laura Donney	August 22, 2025	106
In 1998, Shira and her best friend Rachel "Baby" Feldstein play a basketball variant called "Horse." Yoshi wants to play but Shira will not let him because the game is only for teenagers. Shira finally lets Yoshi do one shot because Baby is hoping Yoshi will help her score. While trying to make a shot, he accidentally causes Shira to have a nosebleed. In 2015, Yoshi is getting ready to help Shira and Kendra conceive a child by donating his sperm. He is given strict instructions to only ejaculate at certain times, with the sampling of his sperm taking place in the morning. Until then, Yoshi intends to stay with his friend Danny. On his way there, Yoshi crosses paths with Baby once again and the two share a meal at a new food truck. They then go to a bar, where after a spiky interaction, they begin to part ways. Yoshi realizes he left his bag containing Baby's purse at the food truck and the two rush back to get it, only to find it has left. They track it down to a neighborhood in San Francisco. On the way, their interactions becoming more flirtatious, and Yoshi questions her about her falling out with Shira, though Baby acts cagey, blames teenage emotions and says Shira just likes to blow up over nothing. Eventually, they find Yoshi's bag and return to Baby's apartment, which is mostly barren as she is due to leave for Shanghai the next morning. Yoshi begins leaving, but decides to turn back at the last second and begins making out with Baby, causing him to immediately ejaculate in his pants, ruining his schedule and making his upcoming sperm donation impossible. Yoshi calls Avi, who arrives with a new pair of pants and proposes they use his sperm instead of Yoshi's as he is on schedule and shares the same genes. The two brothers consider not telling Shira, but decide to be honest. Shira reacts poorly to the news, especially after finding out Yoshi was with Baby, and after saying she and Kendra will get an anonymous donor, slams the door in their faces. Later on, Shira and Kendra find out the latter is pregnant with twin boys.
6	"Wolves"	Katie Aldworth	Keyonna Taylor	August 22, 2025	105
In 1997, the family tries to play Avi's fantasy board game; Avi gets annoyed because they do not understand it and keep complaining while he tries to explain the rules. The game ends when Naomi discovers the game is made in Germany. In 2021, Avi drops Hannah off at a bus stop, where she ponders the idea of having a bat mitzvah and who she could invite, which confuses Avi as he is not raising Hannah to be Jewish and tells her she isn't having a bat mitzvah anyway. After speaking with Jen, his now ex-wife, Avi discovers Hannah was hinting at not having any friends, and she tells him to help her because she won’t talk to her about anything. When Avi brings this up to Hannah, she casually reveals she cannot join any social clubs due to wolves being present at her school, which moved in whilst the school was empty during COVID-19 lockdowns. Avi attends a school meeting where he tries to address the issue of wolves being on the campus, but nobody, including the school administration, take his concerns seriously or even seem to react to wolves roaming the school grounds. A group of concerned and demanding parents, led by Caitlyn McCledon, seemingly hear Avi out and invite him to a gathering to talk more. Avi is disheartened when the parents also don't take the threat of the wolves seriously and instead use the time to complain about menial issues their kids face at school. Caitlyn herself also downplays COVID-19 safety restrictions, which offends Avi as COVID caused Naomi's death. After the parents stage an obnoxious protest and get arrested, the school administration closes the school and move back to remote learning. Hannah is harassed online by her fellow pupils at first, but becomes friends with the children of Avi's new acquaintances by bonding over their dysfunctional parents. Avi attends a final meeting with the concerned parents, where they announce further plans, including starting a podcast. Avi leaves, finds Hannah and apologises for his actions. He acknowledges the other parents took things too far, but stands by his concern over the wolves. The two then travel to the school, where Hannah's new friends are enacting a plan to evict the wolves. Avi and Hannah watch from a distance as the wolves exit the school, with the latter pointing out the wolves' social behaviour and uses it as a metaphor for her and Avi's own relationship. The next day, Avi drops Hannah off at the bus stop once again, only this time, her new friends are waiting for her.
7	"Kendra's Job"	Ben Bjelajac	Rachelle Williams-BenAry	August 22, 2025	107
In 1993, Kendra's father gives her a princess party room at BJ Banana Fingers, a children's birthday funhouse, for her birthday. Kendra does not enjoy the gift due to her tomboy style. A princess sees Kendra not having fun and takes her to the skateboarding room, which she enjoys more. In 2007, before she meets Shira, Kendra is a competitive floor supervisor at "BJ Banana Fingers". Kendra spends so much time working she fails to pay attention to the rest of her life, including her former girlfriend Jax and her younger brother David. Her intense commitment escalates when she is accepted into a managerial training program. Kendra tries her hardest to excel on the program and begins abusing caffeine pills, much to the concern of her loved ones. In the midst of a stressful work routine, Kendra's father suffers a heart attack and she goes to visit him in hospital, where he is comatose. Kendra is forced to wait until he wakes up, despite needing to work later in the day. The combined stress causes her to have a panic attack, requiring her to now stay as a patient. Kendra's father wakes up and Kendra encourages him to slow down, as the stress of his life has caused him to have six heart attacks in total. Her father believes them to be a source of pride, as they were the byproduct of a hard-working life that enabled Kendra to receive a good life. The next day, Kendra's boss demands an explanation for her absence and Kendra lies about celebrating Rosh Hashanah. Her boss accepts this excuse to avoid looking discriminatory. As Kendra leaves, another co-worker, Noah, questions her about being Jewish. Kendra lies about her lifestyle and Noah believes her, inviting her to his shul for Yom Kippur. Kendra later goes on a date with a Jewish man simply to find out more about Jewish culture. The next day, Kendra is told to fire one of the mascot employees by her boss. Kendra forces the employee to unmask, revealing them to be the princess from her birthday party in 1993. Despite this, Kendra reluctantly fires her for removing her mask in front of customers, impressing her boss, but leaving Kendra emotionally devastated. The following day, Kendra visits a synagogue and joins in on the prayers of confession. She breaks down over her firing of the employee, but finds comfort within the Jewish community.
8	"The Intervention"	Aaron Brewer	Elijah Aron	August 22, 2025	108
In 1959, a young Naomi tries to get her parents and big sisters' attention, but they are all absorbed in their own arguments or tasks. She manipulates them by taking a butterfly brooch and stabbing herself in the leg, prompting everyone to pay attention to her. When they do, Naomi simply announces that she rode an entire block on her bike by herself. They congratulate her, but her mother also asks why she didn’t say anything. In 2019, the family meet at a rented beach house in Los Angeles for an intervention for Yoshi, who Naomi supposedly believes is addicted to some kind of substance. Yoshi has been told everyone is coming together for Naomi and Elliot's anniversary celebration as to not arose suspicion. However, when the rest of the family arrive, they begin to believe Naomi is lying about her concerns for Yoshi and it was all a ploy to trick everyone into actually celebrating her anniversary. Tensions rise when Naomi gifts Hannah a mobile phone and Shira is forced to wear a gaudy dress and make-up. Avi hesitates and later fails to stand up to Naomi over Hannah's new phone, as Naomi talks over and guilt trips him whenever he tries. This, along with Naomi's passive-aggressive comments towards her, causes Jen to begin drinking copious amounts of wine over the course of the evening. After Yoshi arrives, the family confront him on his suspicious behaviour, seemingly confirming he may be an addict. In reality, Yoshi is now Orthodox and is hiding it from his Traditionally Jewish family. In an attempt to play into the addict narrative, Yoshi secretly asks his friend Danny to bring him drugs, though Danny does all of them on the drive there. After showing his family the "drugs", which is actually mostly powder laundry detergent, he pretends the intervention worked instantaneously and tries to move on, but Naomi does not believe him. Yoshi reveals his new Orthodox lifestyle, much to her dismay, as it’s not her way of observing and claims it’s yet another example of her children rejecting her. Later, after dinner, Naomi tries force feeding Yoshi non-Kosher food. Shira defends Yoshi, and calls Naomi out for how they’re never good enough for her, but Naomi scoffs at her thinking love should be "passive". When she believes Avi is siding with her, Avi snaps and blows up at Naomi for how smothering and self-absorbed she is to the point she had to trick her own kids into visiting. Naomi is hurt and Avi's siblings acknowledge he went too far. Elliot, who spent most of the night trying to fix the hot tub, reveals he got Hannah to trade her new phone for his camera, since she was only using it for photos anyway. Avi apologizes to Naomi, but points out her overbearing nature and how she is never satisfied with anything her family does. He leaves after telling her he wants to have a better relationship with her, but something has to change. Naomi then joins Yoshi in a hot tub and the two are able to reconcile after she reaches out to him about his shul.
9	"Honoring Naomi Schwartz"	Katie Aldworth	Taryn Englehart	August 22, 2025	109
In 2014, Avi and Naomi are at the playground with Hannah; they discuss Hannah's biting of a kid in her class. Naomi jokes they should call her Cannibal, and blames Avi because Hannah is an only child. Later in the conversation, Naomi talks about the all-female, sibling rock band HAIM, and how she wishes her own children were close enough to do something similar together. In 2002, the family are due to attend a celebration for Naomi at the Jewish Community Center, which falls on the same day as Shira and Baby's 9/11 themed prom, although Shira did not want to go anyway. During one of their hookup sessions in her bedroom, Shira attempts to discuss their relationship, but Baby does not want to confirm if they are official or not, saying she thinks it’s great their relationship doesn’t involve conversations. After Shira and Yoshi pick up Avi from the airport, the siblings decide to do a Mad-Libs style tribute to Naomi since it will be easier for them. At the celebration, various guests tell stories about Naomi, where they praise her qualities and her ability to see the good in people. Avi takes issue with this, as he and his siblings were constantly criticized by Naomi over small things and wonders why strangers got a different version of his mother than her own kids. He also realizes there are several things he never knew about his mother. During the celebration, Yoshi is also trying to avoid Uncle Barry, as he sold many family members some passover candy that failed to arrive in time and Barry is particularly displeased about it. Yoshi hides in a bathroom with his friend Danny and gets drunk on wine to cope with the situation despite his young age. Meanwhile, Shira sneaks out to prom to ask Baby to be official with her, but she finds Baby kissing a boy. After accidentally drawing attention to herself, Baby pulls her under the bleachers, where she dismisses Shira feeling betrayed, revealing she kisses a lot of people including Shira and never had the intention of being serious with her, and the two begin arguing in front of everyone. Shira tries breaking up with Baby, who callously tells her they were never anything to begin with. A heartbroken Shira leaves and rejoins her siblings at the celebration. Avi, Shira and Yoshi are called on stage to read their Mad-Libs speech in honor of their mother, where Avi struggles to come to terms with all the other guests praising Naomi, whilst he has a complicated relationship with her. Shira also breaks down crying, which Naomi believes is due to her finding the ceremony emotional. Yoshi drunkenly announces he ate Barry's passover candies in the bathroom, making him "even" with everyone he sold them to. Barry responds by slowly clapping, seemingly respecting the choice. Back home, Avi is puzzled at Naomi praising their speech, given its quality, but Yoshi reassures him to accept it. He then pukes as his siblings rush to help him. Naomi listens through the door and is happy, telling Elliot that the kids are "helping each other" before the two go to bed.
10	"Uncle Barry"	Katie Rice	Raphael Bob-Waksberg	August 22, 2025	110
In 2000, Naomi and Avi are visiting Uncle Barry in New York. Barry is planning to move from New York to Las Vegas because he cannot afford to live in a big, expensive house since the death of his wife, Sylvia, and not being allowed to practice law in New York anymore. Barry invites Naomi to take items from the house; she finds the butterfly brooch that belonged to her mother but Barry wants to keep it. In 2022, Uncle Barry dies and his funeral is held in Las Vegas. The funeral will be the first time the family is all together again since Naomi's passing. Avi decides on going and brings Hannh, as unbeknownst to her, Jen is in Big Sur with her new partner and is thus unavailable to have Hannah stay with her. Once in Las Vegas, Yoshi is visibly uncomfortable at the funeral and leaves to get coffee, but is distracted by a cat, which he chases throughout Vegas. After returning and realizing he missed the entire funeral and burial, Yoshi decides to go back to Los Angeles for Shabbat, as he cannot handle another family member's passing so soon after his mother's. Meanwhile, Shira confronts her cousin Joni over supposedly eating corn on the cob during Naomi’s ZOOM funeral, even bringing one to wave in her face, but Joni denies doing it. Avi, Hannah, and Elliot attempt to steal Naomi's mother's brooch, which is now worn by Barry's girlfriend. They fail, but Shira reassures Avi that Naomi wouldn't want them to get the brooch back, but to be together. He reluctantly accepts this. Yoshi, who on the way back to Los Angeles, crashed his car due to the cat distracting him and is now at a motel in the desert, is visited by the rest of his family, who intend to help him celebrate Shabbat. They gather the necessary supplies from a local 7-Eleven, including candles, which Yoshi says they cannot light as the Sun has already set. Hannah volunteers to do it, as she is the only non-Jewish person there, and Shira shows her how to perform the ceremony. As the family partakes, Avi abstains, but imagines visions of his mother throughout her life performing alongside them. Everyone then tells stories about Naomi and Uncle Barry, and Elliot concludes they need better reasons to be together instead of only attending funerals. A few days later, Avi is at the bus stop with Hannah and she brings up the idea of having a bat mitzvah once again. She believes it could be a good reason to have all the family together, but also expresses insecurities about her non-Jewish upbringing compared to her family, especially Naomi. Avi assures Hannah that Naomi loved her and that it doesn't matter "how Jewish" she is. Hannah leaves for school. Avi is unable to say he loves her (something he is also shown to do with Shira throughout the season), but she reciprocates. The season ends with Avi waving to Hannah and making faces at her, before his expression sullens as he sits alone in the car.

== Production and release ==
Long Story Short was created by Raphael Bob-Waksberg, the creator of BoJack Horseman, who was also the executive producer of Tuca & Bertie and Undone. Long Story Short was commissioned as a series in August 2024. Bob-Waksberg serves as the showrunner, and the show is executive-produced by Bob-Waksberg, Noel Bright, and Steven A. Cohen. The production companies are The Tornante Company and ShadowMachine. The main voice cast includes Ben Feldman, Abbi Jacobson, Max Greenfield, Lisa Edelstein, Paul Reiser, Angelique Cabral, and Nicole Byer. Each episode's credits contain the disclaimer "This Program Was Made By Humans", denoting generative AI was not used in production. Shortly before the show's release, it was renewed for a second season.

Long Story Short premiered on Netflix on August 22, 2025.

== Reception ==
The review-aggregator website Rotten Tomatoes reported a 100% approval rating based on 36 critic reviews. According to the website's critics' consensus: "Tackling emotionally mature themes with an ingeniously zany sense of humor, Raphael Bob-Waksberg's Long Story Short welcomes viewers into a highly specific—and extremely relatable—family unit". Metacritic, which uses a weighted average, gave a score of 89 out of 100 based on 17 critics, indicating "universal acclaim".

Jenna Scherer of The A.V. Club gave the show's first season a rating of A− and wrote: "The series is all about how people change over the years—and the fact that, no matter how far you run, the past always returns to haunt the present". Reviewing the series' first season for The Guardian, Stuart Heritage gave a rating of 4/5, saying it "reminds us that everything is an echo of what came before. This is a testament to Bob-Waksberg's writing. This level of granular, non-linear character development must have been a feat to construct, and yet it feels effortless."

=== Awards and nominations ===
Award	Date of ceremony	Category	Recipient(s)	Result	Ref.
Astra TV Awards	August 15, 2026	Best Animated Series	Long Story Short	Nominated	

== See also ==
- List of Netflix original programming
