= Olde English (sketch comedy) =

American sketch comedy group

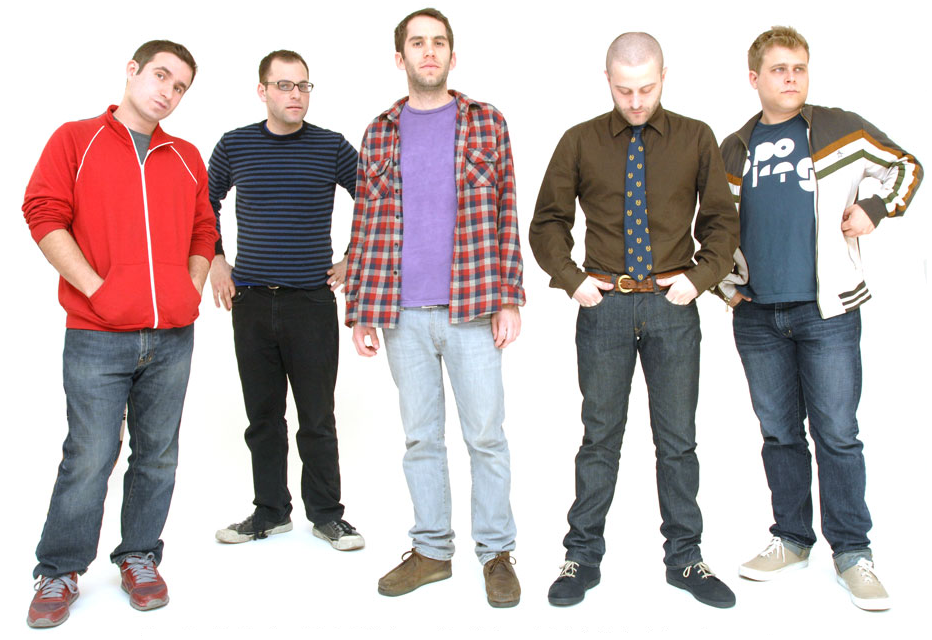
- Members of Olde English in 2010 (from left): Ben Popik, Raphael Bob-Waksberg, David Segal, Caleb Bark, and Adam Conover

Comedy career
- Years active: 2002–2013
- Medium: Film, theatre
- Genre: Sketch comedy
- Members: Caleb Bark; Raphael "Raizin" Bob-Waksberg; Joel Clark; Adam Conover; Jon Dame; Tavit Geudelekian; Adam Janos; Jesse Novak; Ben Popik; Suzanne Richardson; Shira Sandler; Hana Scott-Suhrstedt; David Segal
- Website: www.oldeenglish.org

Olde English was an American sketch comedy troupe based in New York City. The group published over 100 comedy shorts on the internet, and performed live at several venues and festivals in the US.

== History ==
Olde English was formed by a group of students at Bard College, and was originally conceived by Ben Popik. While traveling in Europe during the summer of 2002, Popik chose the name for the group and began writing some of the early sketches. In the fall of 2002, Popik returned to Bard and held auditions for the group. By 2010, Olde English consisted of Adam Conover, Ben Popik, Raphael Bob-Waksberg, Dave Segal, and Caleb Bark, although several others had joined and left over the years.

Olde English produced videos for its website since 2002, usually posting one sketch every two weeks. In 2004, Olde English released its first self-produced DVD, Gorilla Warfare.

The group gained increased popularity in 2003 when their video "Gym Class" became a viral hit. In 2006, the group released a video titled "One Picture Every Day", starring Ben Popik and featuring an original song by former member Jesse Novak. The sketch is a parody of an internet phenomenon popularized by Noah Kalina and Jonathan Keller. The video was seen on Good Morning America as well as a Mountain Dew ad campaign. On January 17, 2007, Olde English announced that its videos would be regularly featured on the comedy website Super Deluxe.

Olde English performed live at the Chicago Sketch Comedy Festival (2005), the San Francisco Sketchfest (2005–2007) and the U.S. Comedy Arts Festival (2007).

Olde English's "Free NYC Rap", a rap music video protesting the restrictions for independent New York City filmmakers that were proposed in Fall 2007, was nominated for a 2007 ECNY award.

== Other projects ==
The members of Olde English—along with former members Joel Clark and Jesse Novak, as well as longtime collaborator Chioke Nassor—completed their first feature film, The Exquisite Corpse Project in 2012. The film first premiered at festivals in June 2012, and became available for commercial download at the end of April 2013.
