= Talking Marriage with Ryan Bailey =

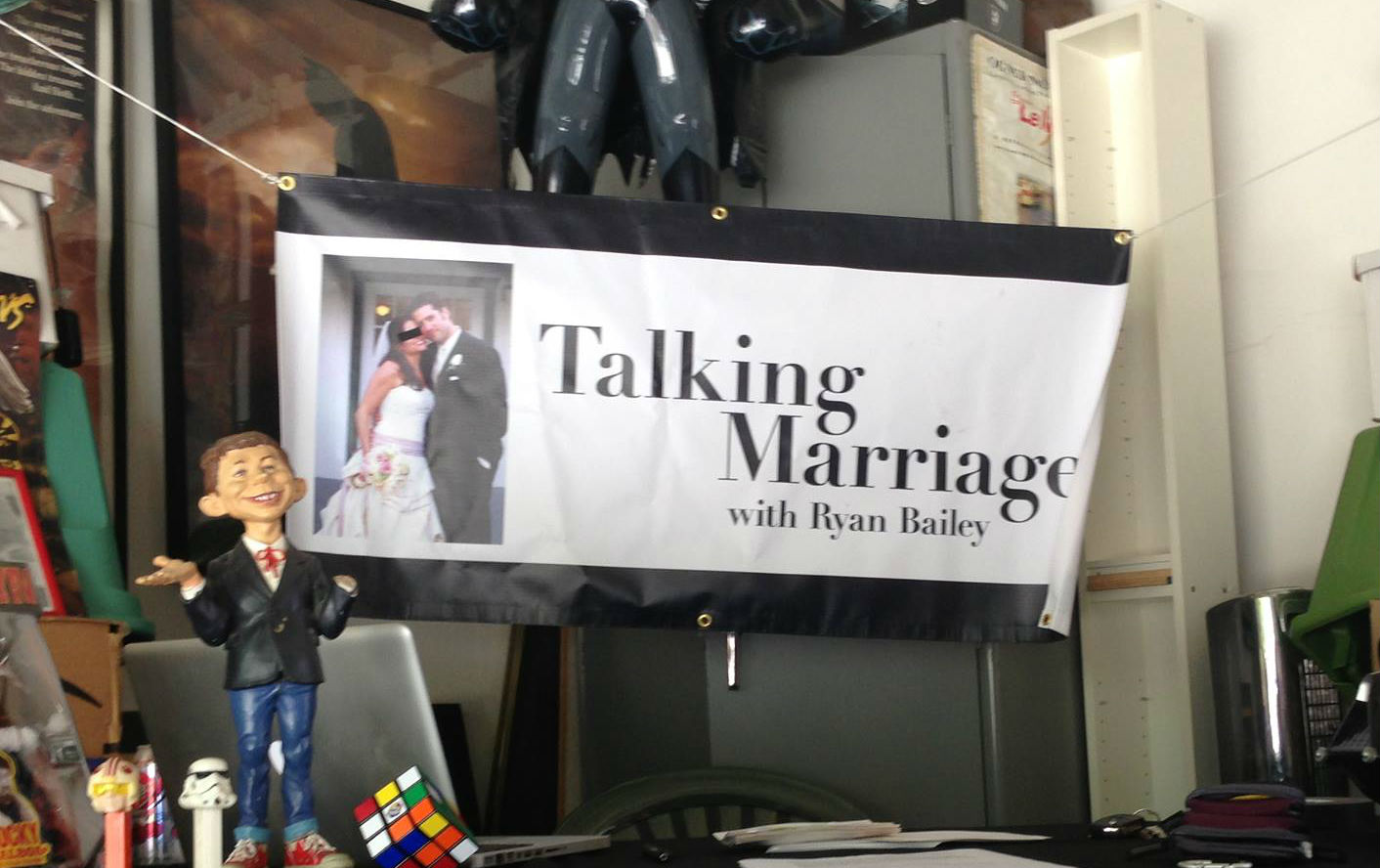
- Talking Marriage Studio
- Also known as: Talking Marriage
- Genre: Comedy, talk show
- Created by: Ryan Bailey
- Starring: Ryan Bailey; Evan Gaustad; Sean Persaud; Tiffany Elle; Joshua Meindertsma
- No. of seasons: 3
- No. of episodes: 24

Original release
- Network: YouTube
- Release: January 15, 2014 – present

Talking Marriage with Ryan Bailey is an American comedy web series created by married Los Angeles–based actor Ryan Bailey. It stars its creator as a combination talk show host/marriage counselor who seeks to pass on his words of wisdom for maintaining a happy state of matrimony, despite his own obvious ineptitude. Each episode contains guests playing fictionalized versions of themselves. The series is distributed via YouTube and airs biweekly, with 'web extras' (consisting of short skits, VLOGs, and commercials) featured on off-weeks.

== Plot ==
Ryan Bailey is a self-styled talk show host and marriage expert who, thanks to his own experience of being 'happily married,' claims to possess the secrets of marriage needed to help others. Convinced that he is a kind of modern-day 'marriage prophet,' he launches his own series. However, Ryan's ambitions vastly outweigh his means to realize them, and as a result he films the show in his garage and relies on his often-reluctant friends to provide technical assistance. Ryan has a troubled relationship with his wife (who remains an unseen character), though he attempts to hide this reality from the crew members and audience. His position as a 'marriage advisor' allows him to ridicule others for their inadequacies, though all too often, his own shine through in the process.

Although Ryan's connections are dubious, he and his crew manage to lure celebrities to take part in the show as guests whom he then interviews. The means by which the celebrities have been induced to participate have included (to date) misinformation, blackmail, and kidnapping. On the rare occasions that a guest fails to materialize, the disappointment and shock is enough to send Ryan into a tailspin that only an impromptu musical number can cure.

== Characters ==
- Ryan (played by Ryan Bailey) – Overconfident and brash, he has a vastly-inflated self-image.
- Evan (played by Evan Gaustad) – Ryan's best friend and soul mate (Ryan's words, not his), responsible for running the camera and coordinating the show (though Ryan claims credit for these duties).
- Sean (played by Sean Persaud) – The beleaguered soundman of the show, whom Ryan often berates for real (but more often, imagined) infractions.
- Josh (played by Joshua Meindertsma) – Something of a musical mascot, Josh serves no discernible purpose from a production standpoint, but provides the living, beating heart of the show with his ukulele playing. In episodes when he is not present, Ryan seems to become more unhinged.
- Tiffany (played by Tiffany Elle) – A 'late addition' to the show (starting on episode 4), Tiffany joined the crew without any explanation of who she is or what purpose she serves... but is an invaluable part of the Talking Marriage team!!
- Brooklyn (played by herself) – Ryan's dog, often seen (but rarely heard) during the episodes.

== Episodes ==
=== Season 1 (2014) ===
No. overall	No. in season	Title	Guest(s)	Written by	Original release date
1	1	"Angelique Cabral"	Angelique Cabral	Ryan Bailey, Evan Gaustad, Sean Persaud	January 22, 2014
2	2	"Lauren Caltagirone"	Lauren Caltagirone	Ryan Bailey, Evan Gaustad, Sean Persaud	February 5, 2014
3	3	"Randall Park and Jae Suh"	Randall Park, Jae Suh Park	Ryan Bailey, Evan Gaustad, Sean Persaud	February 19, 2014
4	4	"Nicholas D'Agosto"	Nicholas D'Agosto	Ryan Bailey, Evan Gaustad, Sean Persaud	March 5, 2014
5	5	"Sally Pressman and David Rogers"	Sally Pressman, David Rogers	Ryan Bailey, Evan Gaustad, Sean Persaud	March 19, 2014
6	6	"Alison Haislip and Nick Mundy"	Alison Haislip, Nick Mundy	Ryan Bailey, Evan Gaustad, Sean Persaud	April 2, 2014
7	7	"Ted Stryker"	Ted Stryker	Ryan Bailey, Evan Gaustad, Sean Persaud	April 16, 2014
8	8	"Nick Rutherford"	Nick Rutherford	Ryan Bailey, Evan Gaustad, Sean Persaud	April 30, 2014

=== Season 2 (2014) ===
No. overall	No. in season	Title	Guest(s)	Written by	Original release date
9	1	"Jesse Soffer"	Jesse Lee Soffer	Ryan Bailey, Evan Gaustad, Sean Persaud	September 24, 2014
10	2	"Adam Korson"	Adam Korson	Ryan Bailey, Evan Gaustad, Sean Persaud	October 8, 2014
11	3	"The Sexy Vegan"	Brian Patton	Ryan Bailey, Evan Gaustad, Sean Persaud	October 22, 2014
12	4	"Comedians in Car Ports"	Esther Povitsky, Matt Knudsen, Melissa Villasenor, Brock Wilbur	Ryan Bailey, Evan Gaustad, Sean Persaud	November 5, 2014
13	5	"Hal Rudnick"	Hal Rudnick	Ryan Bailey, Evan Gaustad, Sean Persaud	November 19, 2014
14	6	"Cary Brothers"	Cary Brothers	Ryan Bailey, Evan Gaustad, Sean Persaud	December 3, 2014
15	7	"Jeff Meacham & Matty Cardarople"	Jeff Meacham, Matty Cardarople	Ryan Bailey, Evan Gaustad, Sean Persaud	December 17, 2014
16	8	"Patrick J. Adams?"	TBA	Ryan Bailey, Evan Gaustad, Sean Persaud	January 7, 2015

=== Season 3 (2015) ===
No. overall	No. in season	Title	Guest(s)	Written by	Original release date
17	1	"Davey Havok"	Davey Havok	Ryan Bailey, Evan Gaustad, Sean Persaud	April 8, 2015
18	2	"Adam Ray"	Adam Ray	Ryan Bailey, Evan Gaustad, Sean Persaud	April 22, 2015
19	3	"Mary Kate Wiles"	Mary Kate Wiles	Ryan Bailey, Evan Gaustad, Sean Persaud	May 6, 2015
20	4	"Jay Ellis"	Jay Ellis	Ryan Bailey, Evan Gaustad, Sean Persaud	May 20, 2015
21	5	"Bryan Safi"	Bryan Safi	Ryan Bailey, Evan Gaustad, Sean Persaud	June 4, 2015
22	6	"The In Laws"	Angelique Cabral & Joel Johnstone	Ryan Bailey, Evan Gaustad, Sean Persaud	June 17, 2015
23	7	"Galen Gering"	Galen Gering	Ryan Bailey, Evan Gaustad, Sean Persaud	July 1, 2015
24	8	"The Invisible Man"	Patrick J. Adams	Ryan Bailey, Evan Gaustad, Sean Persaud	July 22, 2015

== Live show ==
On January 28, 2015, Ryan and the full cast of Talking Marriage performed a special 'Live Show', Talking Marriage with Ryan Bailey LIVE!, at the UCB Sunset Theatre in Los Angeles, CA. The Live Show was directed by Nic Wegener, and featured Suzy Henschel, who played a friend of Ryan's wife (to date, Henschel has not appeared in a regular Talking Marriage episode).
