= Nice While It Lasted =

- BoJack Horseman episode
- The last scene of the series, in which Diane and BoJack look at the sky in silence
- Episode no.: Season 6 Episode 16
- Directed by: Aaron Long
- Written by: Raphael Bob-Waksberg
- Original release date: January 31, 2020
- Running time: 27 minutes

Episode chronology
← Previous "The View from Halfway Down"	Next → —
- BoJack Horseman (season 6)

"Nice While It Lasted" is the series finale of the American animated comedy-drama television series BoJack Horseman. It is the sixteenth episode of the sixth season and the 76th episode overall. The episode, written by series creator Raphael Bob-Waksberg and directed by Aaron Long, was released on Netflix on January 31, 2020, alongside the second half of the sixth and final season.

In this episode, titular character BoJack Horseman is arrested and sentenced to prison for breaking and entering, and his career was ended, but is granted a furlough to attend the wedding of his ex-girlfriend, Princess Carolyn. The episode was widely praised as a poignant ending to the series.

== Plot ==
After the events of "The View from Halfway Down", BoJack is rescued from drowning by the occupants of his former house. BoJack's career ended after he is convicted of breaking and entering and is sentenced to 14 months in a maximum-security prison.

A year later, BoJack is granted furlough and is picked up by Mr. Peanutbutter to attend Princess Carolyn and Judah's wedding; they head off to buy BoJack a suit for the event and BoJack admits that his prison sentence was "kind of for everything" he had done over the years. Mr. Peanutbutter takes BoJack to the Griffith Observatory, where he officially gives back the 'D' to the Hollywoo sign in a celebration of the success of his show Birthday Dad. Due to a misunderstanding, he commissioned a 'B' instead, so that "Hollywoo" is renamed to "Hollywoob".

At the wedding, Todd finds BoJack and asks him for help to go to the beach, saying he wants to sit on BoJack's shoulders to get a better view, adding that he saw BoJack looked overwhelmed at the ceremony and thought a walk would help. The two watch the fireworks for Princess Carolyn and Judah. BoJack tells Todd that he is comfortable being in jail; he stays out of trouble and is beating his sobriety record. Todd convinces him that once he completes his sentence, he just has to set a new record every day. BoJack is amused by his uncertainty over whether Todd is being stupid or smart and Todd cheerfully says "I never know!", before saying that his brief moment of metaphorical intelligence was nice while it lasted, with Bojack agreeing that it was.

Later, BoJack meets with Princess Carolyn and congratulates her on the wedding reception. Princess Carolyn tells BoJack that Hollywoob is waiting for his comeback with The Horny Unicorn, and assures him people may give him another chance. BoJack asks Princess Carolyn to dance, and he tells her he fantasized about convincing her to go through with the wedding. Princess Carolyn assures him that she does not need convincing, and that she is happy with the decision that she has made. BoJack tells her that she deserves to be happy, and asks for representation should he decide to re-enter the business. Princess Carolyn smiles, instead offering to "recommend some excellent people". BoJack returns a smile as they continue to dance.

Later, BoJack climbs onto the roof and finds Diane smoking. BoJack tells her that he misses her, and she reminds him of the voicemail he left when he broke into his old house and nearly drowned. She reveals that she thought he was dead for seven hours, and initially blamed herself for not taking care of him. BoJack apologizes, and both agree they are glad he’s still alive. Diane reveals that she is happily married to Guy, and they have moved to Houston together. She muses that some people help you become who you are despite not being a permanent part of your life, implying that she will be cutting ties with BoJack, which he appears to accept. She thanks him and gets up to leave, but BoJack convinces her to let him tell her a story from prison about his efforts to stop watching The Family Stone every movie night, which culminated in them now watching Pieces of April each time. Diane is amused and says that it is a nice night, and BoJack agrees. The two stare at the sky in silence.

== Production ==
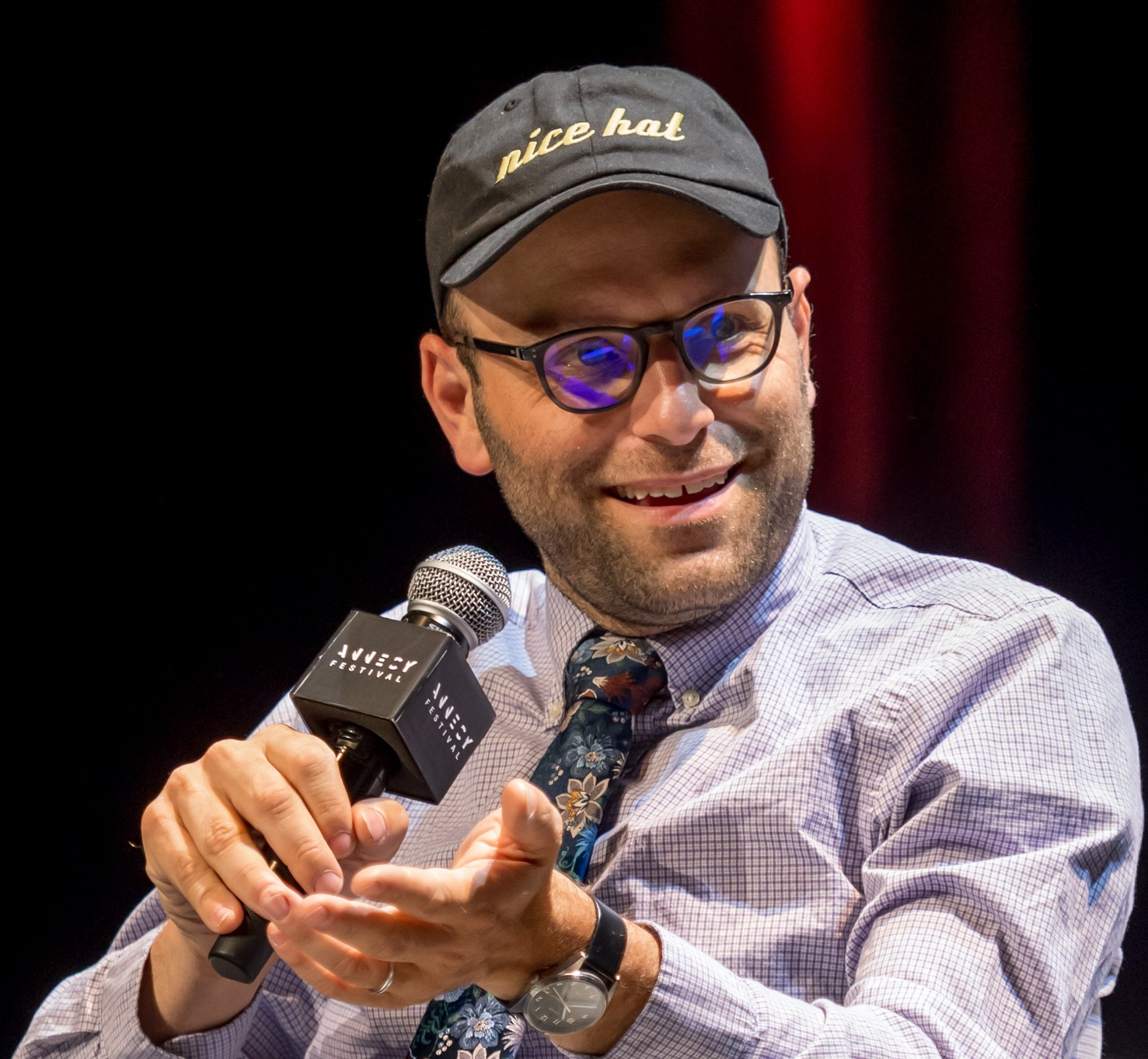
Series creator Raphael Bob-Waksberg wrote the episode.

"Nice While It Lasted" was written by series creator Raphael Bob-Waksberg and directed by Aaron Long. It was released on Netflix on January 31, 2020, alongside the second half of the sixth and final season.

== Critical response ==
"Nice While it Lasted" has received widespread critical acclaim. The A.V. Club's Les Chappell gave it an A rating, calling it "the right bittersweet close for this bittersweet series", noting its poignant understanding of, and ultimate lessons about, life. Scott Meslow of Vulture.com gave it four out of five stars, praising its emotional depth.
