= The Perfect Family (2011 film) =

- Directed by: Anne Renton
- Written by: Paula Goldberg; Claire V. Riley
- Produced by: Jennifer Dubin; Cora Olson
- Starring: Kathleen Turner; Emily Deschanel; Jason Ritter; Michael McGrady; Richard Chamberlain; Elizabeth Peña
- Cinematography: Andre Lascaris
- Edited by: Christopher Kroll
- Music by: Andrew Kaiser
- Production companies: Present Pictures; Certainty Films
- Distributed by: Variance Films
- Release dates: April 24, 2011 (Tribeca Film Festival); May 4, 2012 (United States)
- Running time: 84 minutes
- Country: United States
- Language: English
- Box office: $110,013

The Perfect Family is a 2011 comedy-drama film directed by Anne Renton and starring Kathleen Turner, Emily Deschanel, Jason Ritter, Michael McGrady, Shannon Cochran, Sharon Lawrence, Angelique Cabral, Richard Chamberlain, and Elizabeth Peña.

== Plot ==
Eileen is a devout Catholic and the current front runner for her parish's "Catholic Woman of the Year" award. To win the award and beat her rival, she must prove that she has the perfect Catholic family. However, her recovering alcoholic husband, her lesbian daughter who is having a child with her partner Angela, and her son who has left his wife and kids for an older woman stand in the way of Eileen getting her award. She eventually learns to accept her family for who they are. At the award luncheon Eileen is only with her sister, but in the end her whole family comes to support her.

== Cast ==
- Kathleen Turner as Eileen Cleary
- Emily Deschanel as Shannon Cleary
- Jason Ritter as Frank Cleary Jr.
- Michael McGrady as Frank Cleary
- Shannon Cochran as Mary Donovan
- Sharon Lawrence as Agnes Dunn
- Angelique Cabral as Angela Rayes
- Richard Chamberlain as Monsignor Murphy
- Elizabeth Peña as Christina Reyes
- Gregory Zaragoza as Louis Reyes
- Kristen Dalton as Theresa Henessy
- Laura Cerón as Carmelita
- Scott Michael Campbell as Father Joe MacDonald
- Hansford Rowe as Archbishop Donnelly of Dublin

== Reception ==
The film has a 52% critics' rating on review aggregator website Rotten Tomatoes. Both Frank Scheck of The Hollywood Reporter and Ronnie Scheib of Variety critiqued the film's tone but praised the performances, especially Turner's.
