= Emily Conover =

American science journalist

Emily Conover is an American science journalist, best known for being the only two-time winner of the D.C. Science Writers Association's Newsbrief award. As of 2016, she has been a reporter for American bi-weekly magazine Science News.

== Education ==
In 2014, Conover earned her Ph.D. in physics from the University of Chicago. She then transitioned from science to scientific journalism via the AAAS Mass Media Fellowship at the Milwaukee Journal Sentinel.

== Career ==
In 2015, while she was an intern at Science magazine, Conover won the D.C. Science Writers Association's 2015 Newsbrief Award in the Writing category for her 250-word article ScienceShot “How to prevent a sheep traffic jam," in which she details crowd behavior shared between sheep and humans. In 2018, she won the same award for her Science News article, “How ravens caused a LIGO data glitch,” making her the only person to receive two Newsbrief awards.

In 2015, she began writing news for the American Physical Society. In 2016, she joined Science News as a scientific journalist, covering physics news.

== Personal life ==
Her father is marine biologist and professor David O. Conover and her mother, Margaret Conover, is a botanist and science educator. Her older brother, Adam Conover, is a comedian and was the host of Adam Ruins Everything.
