= Angelique Cabral =

American actress (born 1979)

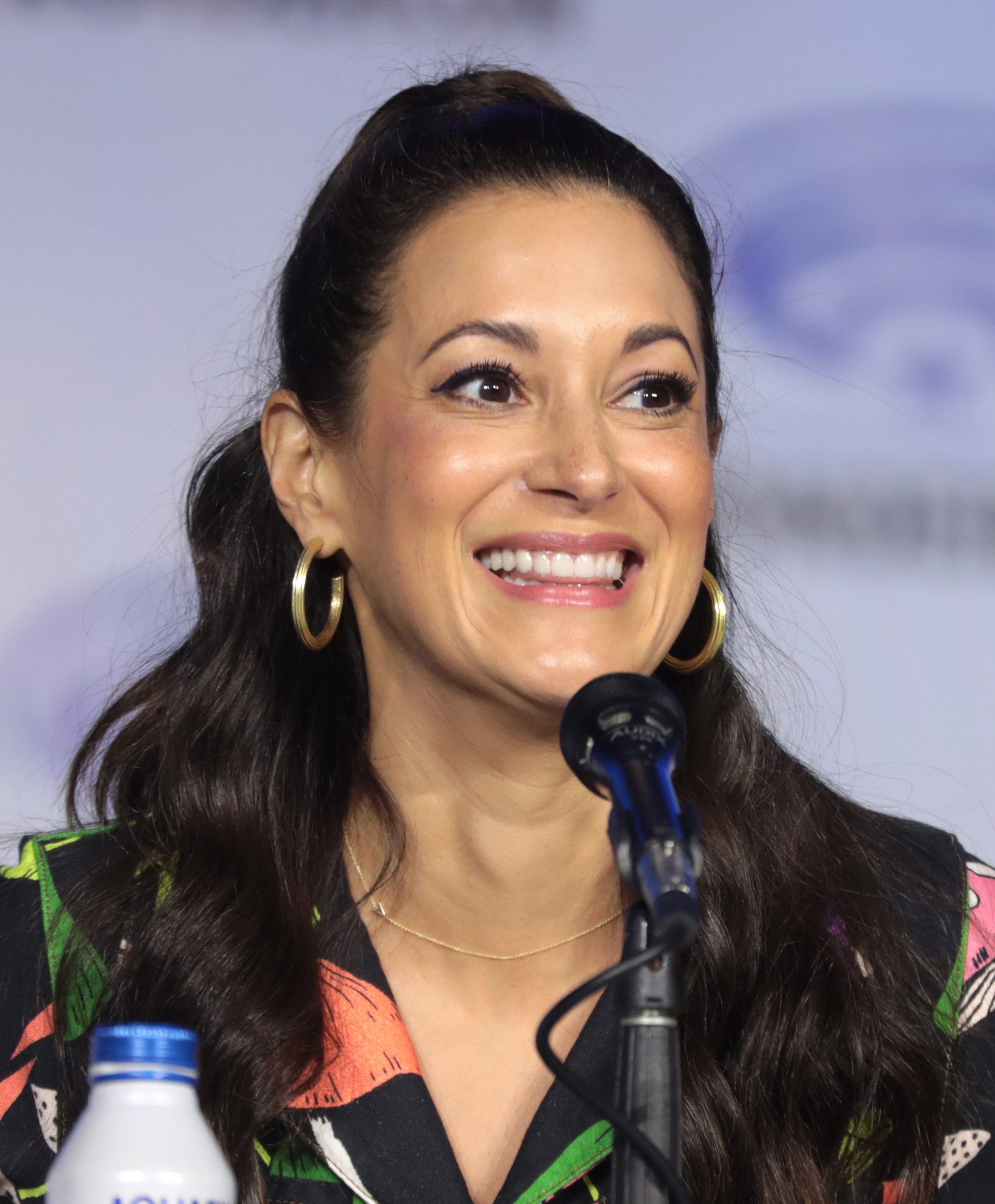
- Cabral in 2022
- Born: January 28, 1979 (age 47); Honolulu, Hawaii, U.S.
- Education: Indiana University Bloomington
- Occupation: Actress
- Years active: 2004–present
- Spouse: Jason Osborn (m. 2013)
- Children: 2
- Relatives: Edie McClurg (first cousin once removed)

Angelique Cabral (born January 28, 1979) is an American actress. She is best known for her roles as Colleen Brandon-Ortega on CBS' sitcom Life in Pieces (2015–2019) and Staff Sergeant Jillian Perez on Fox's comedy television series Enlisted (2014). She has also appeared in films The Perfect Family (2011), Friends with Benefits (2011), Band Aid (2017), and Wish (2023).

== Career ==
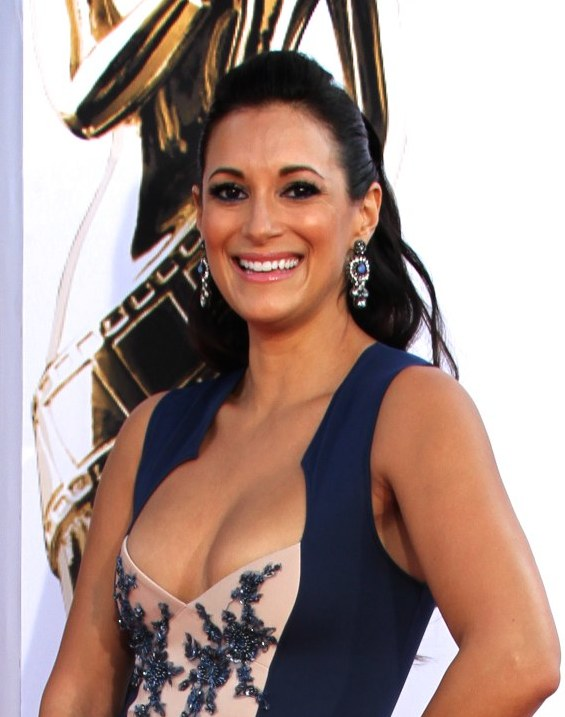
Cabral at the 2014 Alma Awards

Cabral booked her first professional job at 6 months old in a United Airlines commercial. She has appeared in various commercials, such as Citibank, The Home Depot, Captain Morgan, New York Lotto, Blue Cross and Toyota. Her print campaigns include Verizon, Western Union, Olympus, Redbook, Fed Ex, Loestrin. In 2004, she made her first on-screen appearance as Mrs. Mendez on CBS' soap opera Guiding Light, in the episode "Episode #1.14503." She made guest appearances in several episodes of One Life to Live and All My Children between 2005 and 2007. Cabral portrayed Pam Niborski in the romantic comedy film Friends with Benefits (2011) and Angela Rayes in the comedy-drama film The Perfect Family (2011). Friends with Benefits was a commercial success at the box office, grossing over $150.4 million worldwide, against a budget of $35 million. Her stage credits include the Off-Broadway shows "Tape," "Jesse Garon Lives" and "Rubirosa."

She had guest roles on several television shows, including Devious Maids, Two and a Half Men, The Mentalist, Happy Endings, Mad Love, Melrose Place, Bad Judge, State of Affairs, Grey's Anatomy and Criminal Minds. In 2015, she landed the role of Colleen Brandon-Ortega on CBS' sitcom Life in Pieces. The series chronicles the lives of three generations of the Short family as they go about their daily lives in Los Angeles County. The show was canceled by CBS after four seasons on May 10, 2019. In 2016, Cabral was cast as Becca Winograd Diaz in Amazon's animated original series Undone.

== Personal life ==
Her father has Mexican and Native American ancestry and her mother has English and French ancestry. Her mother is a cousin of actress Edie McClurg. She has a half brother, Erin. Cabral grew up in Carmel Valley, California and attended All Saints' Day School and Santa Catalina School.

On July 20, 2013, Cabral married marketing director Jason Osborn. The couple has two children: a daughter, Adelaide, and a son, Alden.

== Filmography ==
Film
Year	Title	Role	Notes
2006	Together	Waitress	
2009	The Lifeboat	Mimi	Short film
2009	Clubophobia	Mimi	Short film
2009	American Way	America	Short film
2010	Vaikoont	Estelle	
2010	Sails Men	Darla	Short film
2011	The Perfect Family	Angela Rayes	
2011	Friends with Benefits	Pam Niborski	
2011	dated.	Maid	Short film
2012	Jennifer	Nurse	Short film
2013	Isolated	Ambassador for Peace	
2017	Band Aid	Lauren	
2018	All About Nina	Carrie	
2021	How It Ends	Diaz	
2023	Wish	Queen Amaya	Voice
2025	For Worse	Sara	
TBA	Nutmeg & Mistletoe †	TBA	Post-production

Television
Year	Title	Role	Notes
2004, 2006	Guiding Light	Mrs. Mendez	2 episodes
2005–2007	All My Children	Waitress / Nurse	4 episodes
2006–2007	One Life to Live	Waitress / Teacher	5 episodes
2010	Melrose Place	Actress #1	Episode: "Sepulveda"
2011	Mad Love	Erika	2 episodes (1 uncredited)
2011	Happy Endings	Waitress	Episode: "Pilot"
2011	Two and a Half Men	Shannon	Episode: "Nice to Meet You, Walden Schmidt"
2011	Happy Endings	Vanessa	Episode: "The Code War"
2012	Free Agents	Gwen	Episode: "Nice Guys Finish... at Some Point"
2012	The Glades	Dr. Tara Valdez	Episode: "Fountain of Youth"
2013	Don't Trust the B— in Apartment 23	Fox Paris	2 episodes
2013	Devious Maids	Xaviera	Uncredited; episode: "Pilot"
2014–2015	Talking Marriage with Ryan Bailey	Herself	2 episodes
2014	Enlisted	Jill Perez	Main cast; 13 episodes
2014	The Mentalist	Gina Petrocelli	Episode: "Silver Wings of Time"
2014	Criminal Minds	Sarah Ryan	Episode: "Fate"
2015	NCIS: Los Angeles	Agent Paola Fuentes	Episode: "Black Wind"
2015	Chicago P.D.	Gina Gawronski	Episode: "Erin's Mom"
2015	The Odd Couple	Amy	Episode: "The Unger Games"
2015	Transparent	Melanie	Episode: "Cherry Blossoms"
2015–2019	Life in Pieces	Colleen Brandon Ortega Short	Main cast
2016	Fresh Off the Boat	Toni	Episode: "Keep 'Em Separated"
2016	Grey's Anatomy	Laura	Episode: "At Last"
2019–2022	Undone	Becca Winograd Diaz	Main cast
2019–2020	Grace and Frankie	Liz	Seasons 5-6 (Recurring role)
2021–2023	With Love	Daphne	2 episodes
2021–2023	DreamWorks Dragons: The Nine Realms	Hazel Gonzalez	Voice; 9 episodes
2022	Maggie	Amy	Main cast
2022–2023	Big Sky	Carla	Season 3 (Recurring role)
2025-2026	The Neighborhood	Lisa	Recurring role
2025	Long Story Short	Jen Schwooper	Voice; main cast
2026	9-1-1	Leona	Episode: "Fire in the Hole"
