= David O. Conover =

American marine biologist and professor

- Born: David Olmstead Conover; August 26, 1953 (age 72); Miami, Florida, United States
- Education: Eckerd College (B.S. 1975); University of Massachusetts Amherst (Ph. D., 1982)
- Spouse: Margaret Conover (née Howard) (m. 1982)
- Children: Adam Conover; Emily Conover
- Awards: 1997 Mote Eminent Scholar Chair in fisheries ecology 2015 Oscar E. Sette Award from the American Fisheries Society
- Scientific career
- Fields: Marine biology
- Institutions: Stony Brook University
- Thesis: Seasonal migration, reproductive strategy, and environmental sex determination and its adaptive significance in the Atlantic silverside, Menidia menidia (1982)

David Olmstead Conover (born August 26, 1953) is an American marine biologist and professor in the School of Marine and Atmospheric Sciences at Stony Brook University. He was the Vice President for Research at Stony Brook University and operations manager for the SUNY Research Foundation, and until his retirement in 2020 he was vice president for Research and Innovation at the University of Oregon. He is known for his research on the ecology of marine fishes and fisheries. His son is Adam Conover, host of Adam Ruins Everything, and his daughter is Emily Conover, scientific journalist at Science News.

== Career ==
David O. Conover joined the faculty of Stony Brook University in 1981 as an assistant professor. In 1995, he was named Associate Dean of Marine Sciences. In 1997, he was named the first Mote Eminent Scholar Chair in fisheries ecology. From 2003 to 2010, he was the dean of the School of Marine and Atmospheric Sciences at Stony Brook University, after which he became director of the National Science Foundation's division of ocean sciences, while remaining on the faculty at Stony Brook. In 2013, he left the National Science Foundation, and was named Interim Vice President for Research at Stony Brook; he became vice president for Research there two years later. Also in 2015, he received the Oscar E. Sette Award from the American Fisheries Society.

In 2016, he became the Vice President for Research and Innovation at the University of Oregon. He retired in 2020.

On October 27, 2015, Conover appeared as himself in the fifth episode of his son Adam's television series on TruTV, Adam Ruins Everything.
