= Adam Conover =

American comedian (born 1982/83)

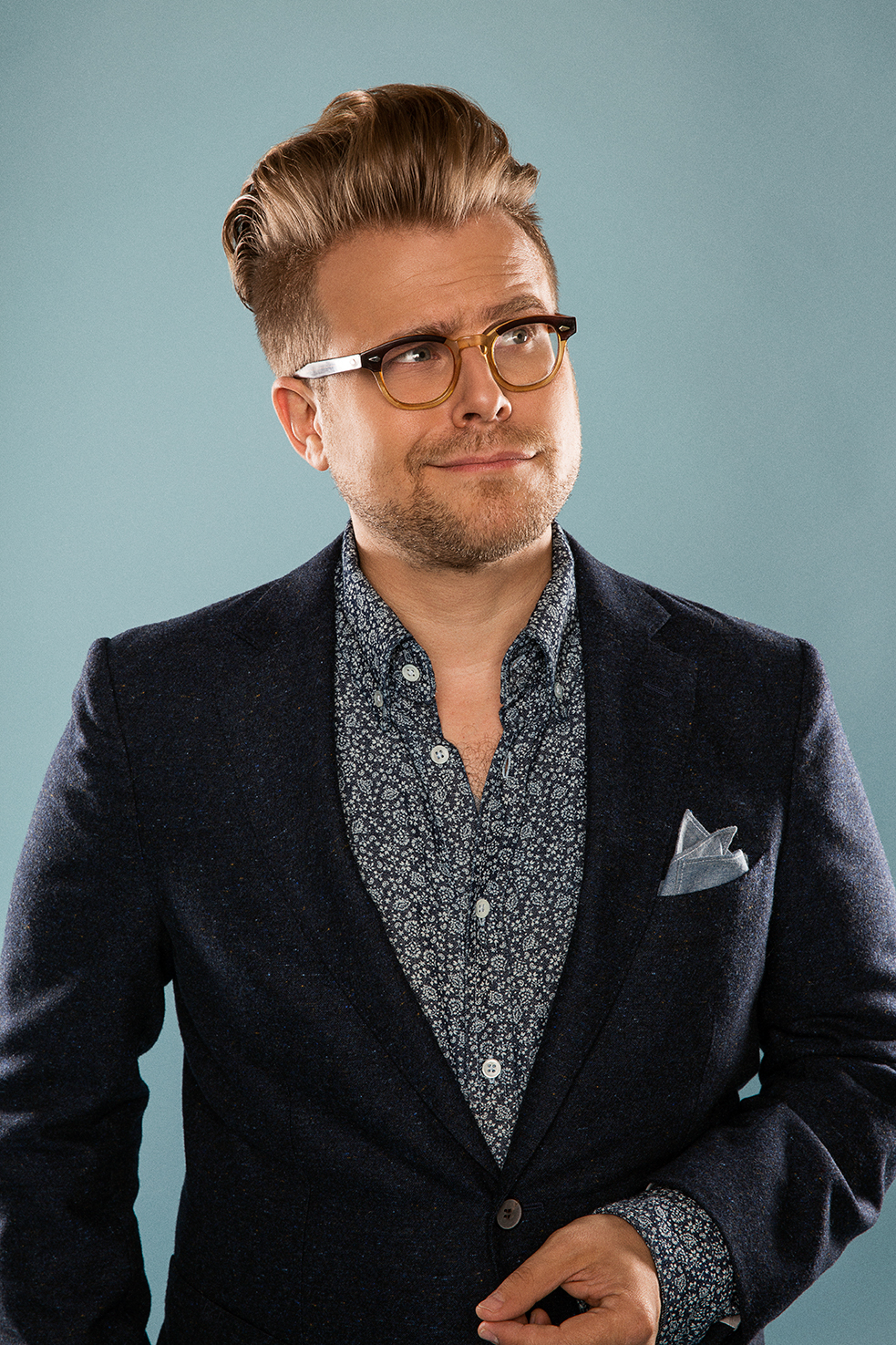
- Conover in 2014
- Born: 1982 or 1983 (age 43–44); Smithtown, New York, U.S.
- Education: Bard College (BA)
- Occupations: Comedian; writer; show host; podcast host
- Years active: 2004–present
- Known for: Adam Ruins Everything; BoJack Horseman
- Board member of: Writers Guild of America West (2021–present)
- Website: adamconover.net

Adam Conover (born 1982 or 1983) is an American actor, writer, comedian, and television host. He created and hosted the half-hour truTV show Adam Ruins Everything, based on the CollegeHumor series of the same name. He was also the host of the American version of The Crystal Maze on Nickelodeon. In 2022, Conover's limited series The G Word with Adam Conover debuted on Netflix. Conover serves on the board of the Writers Guild of America West. He also hosts the podcast Factually! With Adam Conover. He has voiced "A Ryan Seacrest Type" as well as other characters on BoJack Horseman.

== Early life and education ==
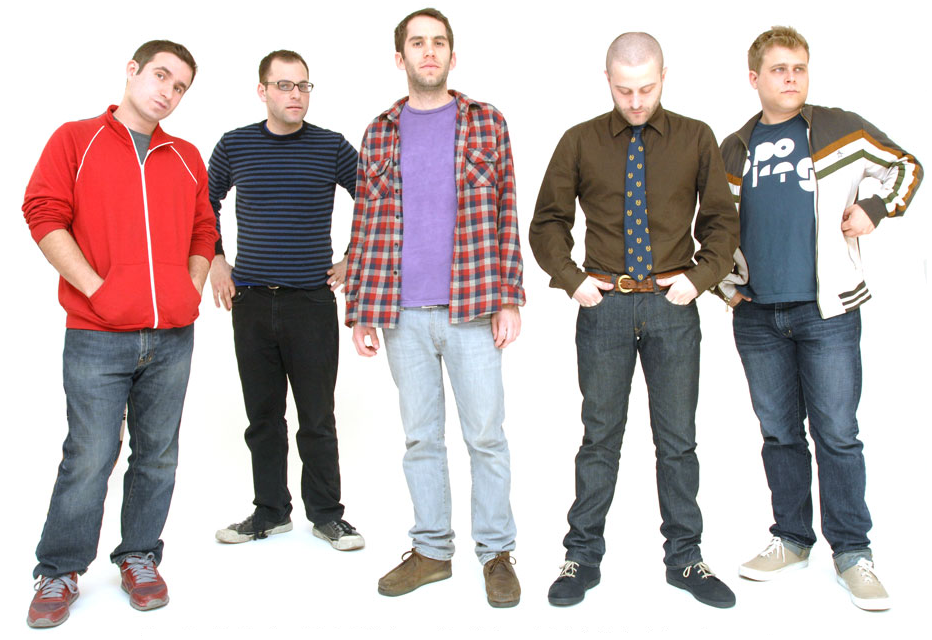
Members of the sketch comedy group Olde English. From left to right: Ben Popik, Raphael Bob-Waksberg, David Segal, Caleb Bark, and Adam Conover

Adam Conover was born in Smithtown, New York, and grew up in nearby Wading River, on the North Shore of Long Island. His parents are David O. Conover, a marine biologist, and Margaret Conover (née Howard), a botanist. His younger sister, Emily, is a science reporter who holds a Ph.D. in particle physics. Conover has described himself as "the only member of the family without a Ph.D." As a teen, he designed webpages and taught himself HTML.

In 2000, he graduated from Shoreham-Wading River High School, where he became interested in performing arts. As a teenager, he was part of a music band called Bocoach. He then attended Bard College, where, in 2002, he became an active member of the sketch comedy group Olde English. In 2004, he earned a bachelor's degree in philosophy from Bard College.

== Career ==
In 2012, Conover began working as a sketch comedy writer and performer for the website and YouTube channel CollegeHumor, where he eventually created the web series that would go on to become Adam Ruins Everything on TruTV. The first episode of the TruTV show, which aims to reveal untold truths and to dispel common misconceptions, premiered in September 2015. Conover has said his character in the show is a comedic interpretation of the person he worries he once was or is. As he told The New York Observer, "It's the reaction I've gotten my whole life: that I learn something and try to tell people in conversation, but when I tell them, they are annoyed."

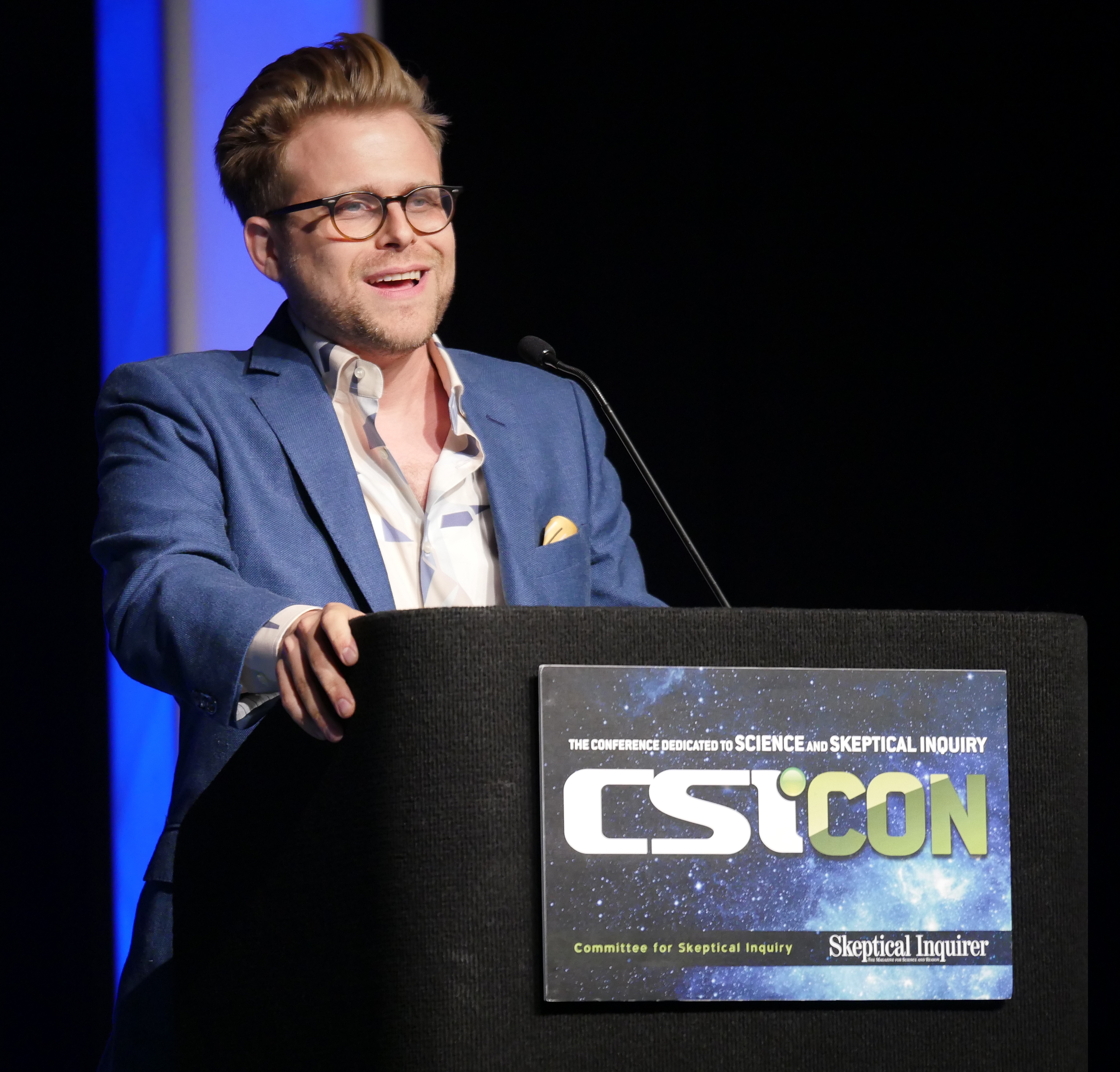
Conover at the 2018 CSICon

In 2018, Conover was the headliner of the first night of the annual CSICon conference for skeptics.

He has voiced several characters in the Netflix animated series BoJack Horseman, including A Ryan Seacrest Type, one of the Paparazzi Birds, and Bradley Hitler-Smith. In 2019, he voiced the character Big_Hairy_Stallion_69 on the Netflix series Tuca & Bertie, and he created the Earwolf podcast Factually!

In 2020, Conover hosted the American adaptation of the British family game show The Crystal Maze for Nickelodeon. In November, he made a cameo appearance as his character from Adam Ruins Everything in The Eric Andre Show. In December, he announced that Adam Ruins Everything was no longer in production and that he was planning a new Netflix series about the federal government, called The G Word with Adam Conover. The show premiered in May 2022 and ran for six episodes.

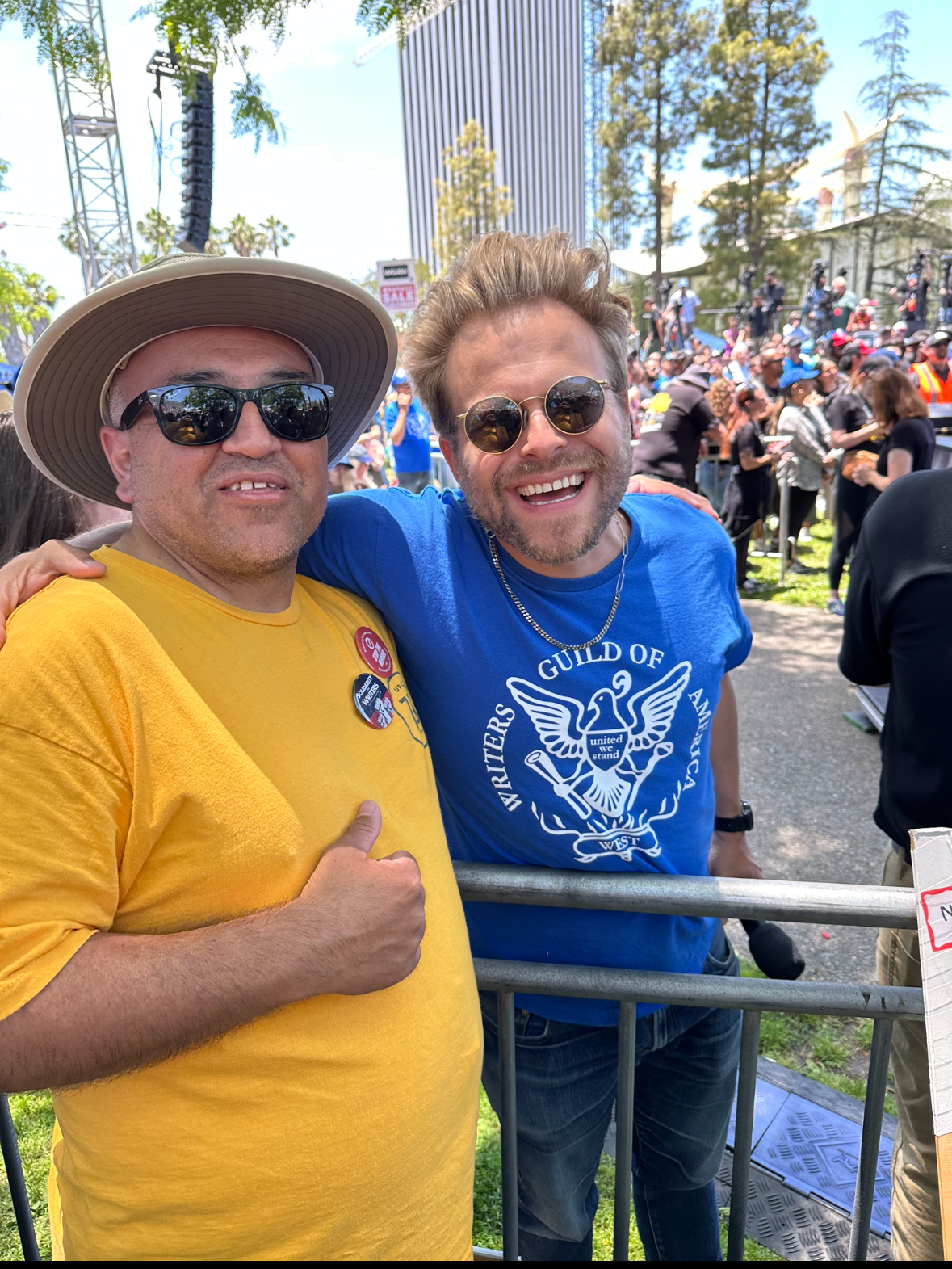
Conover at a picket line during the 2023 Writers Guild of America strike

Conover serves on the board of the Writers Guild of America West, and he sat on the 2023 WGA contract negotiating committee.

In 2025, Conover released a video promoting the cryptocurrency project World Network. He subsequently released an apology video, said he would not accept any further money from World, and called World's Orb "the creepiest tech product Silicon Valley has ever produced".

== Personal life ==
Conover was once a roommate of BoJack Horseman creator Raphael Bob-Waksberg in New York City, who introduced him to his former partner, illustrator Lisa Hanawalt. Conover had a 15-year relationship with Hanawalt. Conover quit drinking in early 2018. However, according to his 2026 stand-up special Adam Conover: Big Divorce Energy, he has since taken it up again. In the same special, he said he had joined the dating app Feeld and that he marked his sexual orientation as heteroflexible.

=== Political views ===
In 2020, Conover was an outspoken supporter of Nithya Raman, who challenged and beat David Ryu for the Los Angeles City Council. As an activist for Housing First policies, Conover performed stand-up to fundraise for the campaign and canvassed in support of Raman.

== Filmography ==
Year	Title	Role	Notes
2014–2019	BoJack Horseman	A Ryan Seacrest Type, Bradley Hitler-Smith, Paparazzi Blue Jay, and additional characters	
2015–2019	Adam Ruins Everything	Himself	Creator, also executive producer
2015–2022	Um, Actually	Himself	4 episodes
2019	WTF 101	Doctor Gamma	CollegeHumor original programming
2019–2021	Tuca & Bertie	Joel	
2020	The Crystal Maze	Host	
2020	The Eric Andre Show	Self	"Is Your Wife Still Depressed?"
2022	The G Word with Adam Conover	Himself	Creator, also executive producer
2023	Game Changer	Himself	"Game Changer: Battle Royale"
2024	Dropout Presents	Himself	Standup special, Unmedicated
2024	Animation Workers Ignited Shorts	Umbert Actually	
2026–present	Umbert Actually!	Umbert Actually	Executive producer
2026	Adam Conover: Big Divorce Energy	Himself	Standup special, also executive producer
