= Undone (TV series) =

American animated television series

- Genre: Comedy drama; Psychological drama; Mystery; Science fiction; Fantasy
- Created by: Kate Purdy; Raphael Bob-Waksberg
- Directed by: Hisko Hulsing
- Starring: Rosa Salazar; Angelique Cabral; Constance Marie; Siddharth Dhananjay; Daveed Diggs; Bob Odenkirk
- Composer: Amie Doherty
- Country of origin: United States
- Original language: English
- No. of seasons: 2
- No. of episodes: 16

Production
- Executive producers: Kate Purdy; Raphael Bob-Waksberg; Noel Bright; Steven A. Cohen; Tommy Pallotta; Hisko Hulsing (season 2); Bruno Felix (season 2); Femke Wolting (season 2)
- Producers: Bob Odenkirk; Richard Choi; Bruno Felix (season 1); Femke Wolting (season 1); Rosa Salazar (season 2); Patrick Metcalf (season 2)
- Cinematography: Nick Ferreiro
- Editor: Brian Swanson
- Running time: 22–26 minutes
- Production companies: The Tornante Company; Hive House Project; Boxer vs. Raptor (season 1); Vegan Blintzes (season 2); Submarine Amsterdam; Amazon Studios

Original release
- Network: Amazon Prime Video
- Release: September 13, 2019 – April 29, 2022

Undone is an American adult animated psychological comedy drama television series created by Kate Purdy and Raphael Bob-Waksberg with Rosa Salazar in the starring role. It premiered on September 13, 2019, on Amazon Prime Video, to critical acclaim. The series is Amazon's first adult animated original series, and its first to use rotoscoping.

In November 2019, Amazon renewed Undone for a second season, which premiered on April 29, 2022.

== Premise ==
Undone explores "the elastic nature of reality through its central character, Alma. After being in a nearly fatal car crash, Alma discovers she has a new relationship with time, and uses this ability to find the truth about her father’s death."

== Cast and characters ==
=== Main ===
- Rosa Salazar as Alma Winograd-Diaz, a Mexican American woman who begins to develop the ability to manipulate and move through time following a car crash.
- Angelique Cabral as Becca Winograd-Diaz, Alma's younger sister, who is engaged to be married.
- Constance Marie as Camila Diaz, Alma's mother, who worries about Alma's mental health following her crash.
- Siddharth Dhananjay as Sam, Alma's boyfriend, whom she enlists to help her investigate the death of her father.
- Daveed Diggs as Tunde (season 1), Alma's boss at the daycare.
- Bob Odenkirk as Jacob Winograd, Alma's dead father, who enlists her help in investigating his death.

=== Supporting ===
- Kevin Bigley as Reed Hollingsworth, Becca's fiancé.
- Sheila Vand as Farnaz, Jacob's student and research assistant who also was killed in the crash.
- Holley Fain as Geraldine (born Ruchel) Winograd, Jacob's mother and Alma's grandmother who has the same abilities as her children and grandchildren but is institutionalized for it. Veda Cienfuegos plays a young Ruchel in her memories.
- Alma Martinez as Rosario de Alejandro, a mystic who helps Camila when she is alone and pregnant as a young woman and who assists Alma and Becca with their search.
- Jeanne Tripplehorn as Beth Hollingsworth (season 1), Reed's mother.
- John Corbett as Layton Hollingsworth (season 1), Reed's father.
- Tyler Posey as Father Miguel (season 1), a priest at Camila's church.
- Brad Hall as Charlie (season 1), a mysterious person whose company originally funded Jacob's research, and whom Jacob suspects of killing him.
- Carlos Santos as Alejandro (season 2), a mysterious man from Camila's past.

== Episodes ==
Season	Episodes	Originally released
1	8	September 13, 2019
2	8	April 29, 2022

=== Season 1 (2019) ===
No. overall	No. in season	Title	Directed by	Written by	Original release date
1	1	"The Crash"	Hisko Hulsing	Kate Purdy and Raphael Bob-Waksberg	September 13, 2019
A distressed woman named Alma is crying in her car before she runs a red light and has a near fatal accident. In the past, Alma reflects on the ennui of her life. Her sister announces she is engaged, and Alma begins to question her own relationship and whether or not she is destined to be happy. She chooses to break up with her boyfriend, and gets into a fight with her sister over the engagement after she plays a role in her sister cheating on her fiance with a bartender. Back to the present, the fight is shown to be the reason why Alma is crying in her car. Just before the crash, Alma has a vision of her father, who has been dead for over 20 years.
2	2	"The Hospital"	Hisko Hulsing	Kate Purdy and Raphael Bob-Waksberg	September 13, 2019
3	3	"Handheld Blackjack"	Hisko Hulsing	Kate Purdy and Raphael Bob-Waksberg	September 13, 2019
4	4	"Moving the Keys"	Hisko Hulsing	Kate Purdy and Raphael Bob-Waksberg	September 13, 2019
5	5	"Alone in This (You Have Me)"	Hisko Hulsing	Kate Purdy	September 13, 2019
6	6	"Prayers and Visions"	Hisko Hulsing	Lauren Otero	September 13, 2019
7	7	"The Wedding"	Hisko Hulsing	Joanna Calo	September 13, 2019
8	8	"That Halloween Night"	Hisko Hulsing	Elijah Aron	September 13, 2019
Alma takes herself and Jacob back in time to the night of the lab break-in which is revealed to have been done by Camila after she learned that Jacob was experimenting on Alma. Farnaz then planned to reveal the truth to Camila and the head of their department which would've ruined Jacob's life. After a failed attempt by Jacob to get Alma to change her own past, she finally learns that Jacob had not been murdered but had purposefully driven himself and Farnaz off a cliff. Jacob decides to possess his past-self in an effort to change the past and promises to meet Alma at a pyramid in Mexico when the timelines realign. In the present, Sam and Camila attempt to convince Alma that she is schizophrenic as was her father. Alma breaks up with Sam, travels to Mexico, and spends the night at the pyramid waiting for Jacob. She is joined by Becca whose marriage to Reed has fallen apart. By morning, Jacob has failed to appear, causing Alma to doubt herself. After Becca leaves and the sun rises over the pyramid, Alma is shocked by something she sees coming from the cave and enters it.

=== Season 2 (2022) ===
No. overall	No. in season	Title	Directed by	Written by	Original release date
9	1	"The Cave"	Hisko Hulsing	Kate Purdy	April 29, 2022
Alma leaves the cave, thinking nothing has changed when she meets a mysterious woman. Becca is no longer with her and when Alma calls her, she is on her honeymoon with Reed and confirms Jacob is alive. Alma returns home to see her father alive in his office. They celebrate their successful change to the timeline and he informs her that she is a professor at the same college now and has learnt Spanish. She pushes him to help his mother, Geraldine, but he warns her against further interference. Alma notices she cannot time travel at will anymore when she cannot prevent a woman being hit by a car. She has a short vision of her mother, Camilla in a car with an unknown man. After talking to Becca, she discovers that this was her memory and that Becca has the same powers she does.
10	2	"The Painting"	Hisko Hulsing	Elijah Aron	April 29, 2022
Jacob and Camilla are fighting about things she keeps hidden from him. Alma tries to convince the reluctant Becca to embrace her powers. Alma sees a mysterious door in her visions but is unable to open it, even with Becca's help. Becca has a fight with Reed over her still taking birth control when they are trying to conceive a child. Alma meets Sam who is still a waiter and not her boyfriend. Camilla leaves home after Alma and Becca confront her about things she's hiding from the family and her connection to a man named Alejandro.
11	3	"Mexico"	Hisko Hulsing	Gonzalo Cordova	April 29, 2022
Alma and Becca travel to Mexico to find their mother but their only clue is a painting signed with "Alejandro". Her mother denies knowing anything but their aunt tells them about Camilla's affair with a priest in training when she was eighteen. They find the priest but he has broken off all contact to her. Becca has a vision of Camila going into the house from the painting and being confronted by their grandmother who disowns her. When Alma and Becca arrive at the house from the memory, Becca faints.
12	4	"Reflections"	Hisko Hulsing	April Shih	April 29, 2022
Alma discovers that the house is owned by the woman she met at the cave, who turns out to be a mystic. They help Becca lie down to recover and Alma tells Jacob about where they are. Camila is living there but not at the house. The woman's last name is "Alejandro", revealing her to be the painter of the image they found. Becca has a vision of having a baby that Alma and Jacob cannot see. It is revealed that she is reliving Camila's memories of giving birth when she was eighteen to her hitherto unrevealed son, who she named Alejandro after the mystic and gave away to be adopted.
13	5	"Lungs"	Hisko Hulsing	Carmiel Banasky	April 29, 2022
Alma, Becca and Jacob manage to find Alejandro's apartment only to discover Camila there. In flashbacks, his life is seen in the orphanage, having never been adopted and leaving to work in an oil field. Even though he manages to leave that work behind, his exposure to toxic fumes has irrevocably damaged his lungs. It is revealed that Camila has been keeping in contact with Alejandro for years after he contacted her as an adult and she paid for his treatment. However, when he learns that Camila came to visit him as a child with plans to adopt him herself, only to leave him behind at Jacob's mother's urging, he throws them out. Alma is enveloped in fog and sees the mysterious door in the hallway and hears crying behind it, surmising, that it must be Alejandro as a child. Becca opens a time portal to Geraldine's past but only Alma uses it and gets stuck.
14	6	"Help Me"	Hisko Hulsing	Mehar Sethi	April 29, 2022
Alma is stuck in a mental asylum where Geraldine is treated, thirty years before she talked Camila out of adopting Alejandro. She unsuccessfully tries to convince Geraldine to open up about her childhood to find out what happened to her. After meeting Jacob as a child, Alma plays the song he taught them, which Geraldine recognizes. Becca hears the song through the times and opens a portal for Alma to return. Alma reveals to the reluctant Becca that she manipulated the timelines to save Jacob from killing himself and his assistant which Becca had previously seen but thought to be a dream. Knowing that Jacob's life was saved, they decide to save Geraldine together. They reenter Alma's vision of the mysterious door but Jacob recognizes that it must be Geraldine behind. He calls out her real name, Ruchel and the door opens.
15	7	"Rectify"	Hisko Hulsing	Elijah Aron & Patrick Metcalf	April 29, 2022
Ruchel recounts her childhood in early-1930s Poland where she lives with her Jewish parents in a small village. One day, a police officer and member of the fascist National Radical Camp comes to see her mother, who is known as being able to see the future, to inquire whether his marriage proposal will be successful. Ruchel, who has been taught by her mother, sees that she will reject him but her mother lies that she cannot see in order to not make him angry. The family burns all their books about seeing the future and books a trip of a steamer to emigrate. Ruchel sees their plan fail in a vision but she doesn't say anything to them and before they can leave, the officer returns and arrests her parents because he believes her mother cursed him to be rejected. Ruchel survives by hiding in the shed and emigrates alone, adopting the ship's name as her own. Jacob tries to alter the past by possessing her father to listen to her and later the police officer but repeatedly fails, hurting himself in the process. Alma tries to find a version of Geraldine that is willing to open up about her childhood and to stop Jacob from killing himself trying to save her. She manages to convince one Geraldine to come back with her to the past and stop Jacob by forgiving her younger self who she blamed for her parents' death. This changes the past so that Ruchel never adopts the name Geraldine and does not prevent Camila from adopting Alejandro, who she and Jacob adopt into their family and grows up with his sisters. The family remembers Ruchel together after her death.
16	8	"We All Love Each Other"	Hisko Hulsing	Kate Purdy	April 29, 2022
Alma wakes up to find out that Jacob had a stroke. She wants to go back in time to prevent his partial paralysis but he signs to her that he is happy to have saved his mother and does not want to lose that. A short while later, Jacob passes away, with Alma having a vision of him, Ruchel and his grandparents. Despite everything being good otherwise, Alma has visions that indicate that something still needs fixing. She discovers that her old life and timeline is still broken and decides to return to it to help her family heal. Alma returns to the cave in Mexico with Becca where she reconciles with her mother, agrees to get help and to consider reconciling with Sam. As they drive away, Alma appears to see Rosario for a moment, but dismisses it.

== Production ==
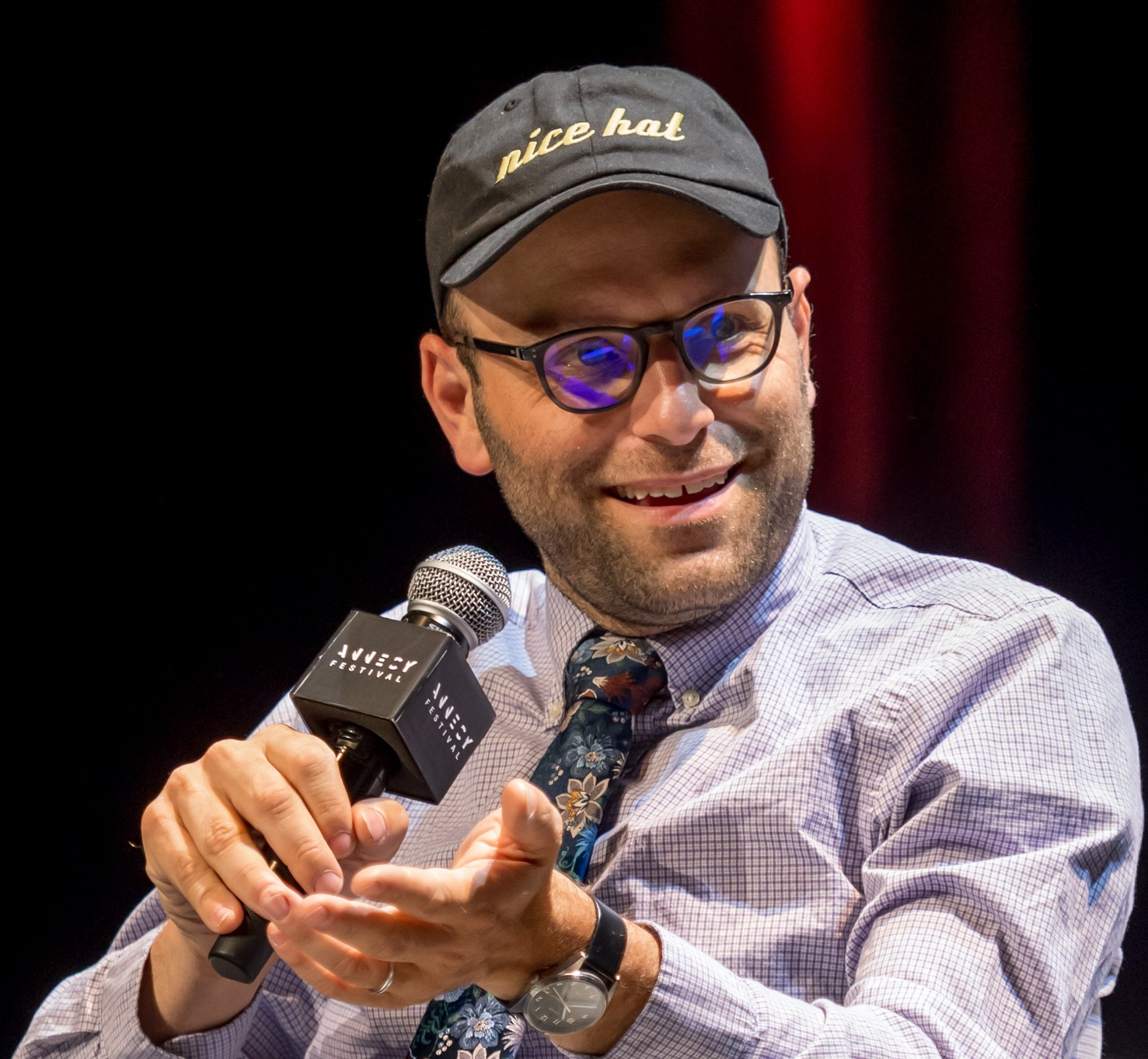
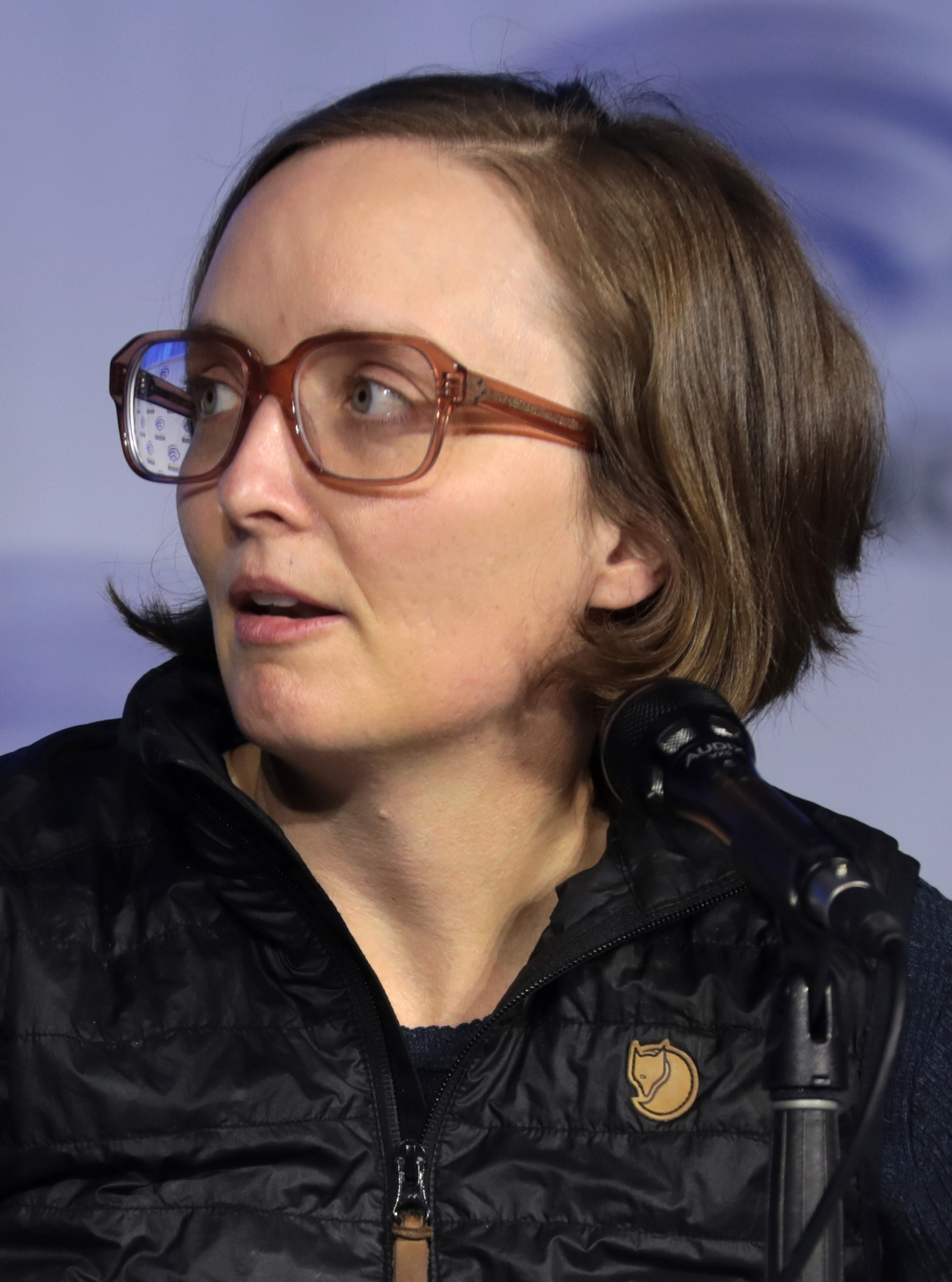
Creators Raphael Bob-Waksberg and Kate Purdy

On March 6, 2018, it was announced that Amazon had given the production a straight-to-series order for one season. The series, starring Rosa Salazar in the lead role, was created by Raphael Bob-Waksberg and Kate Purdy, who also executive produce alongside Noel Bright, Steven A. Cohen, and Tommy Pallotta. Hisko Hulsing oversaw the production design and directed a team of animators working in the Netherlands. Undone's animation is created through a combination of live action motion capture and rotoscoping. Production companies involved with the series include The Tornante Company and animation companies Submarine and Minnow Mountain. On November 21, 2019, the series was renewed for a second season alongside Purdy signing an exclusive deal with Amazon. The eight-episode second season was released on April 29, 2022.

== Critical reception ==
Undone received critical acclaim. Review aggregator website Rotten Tomatoes reports that 98% of 57 critic reviews are positive for the first season, with an average rating of 8.3/10. The website's critics consensus reads, "A kaleidoscopic existential crisis, Undone bends the rules of space, time, and rotoscoping to weave a beautifully surreal tapestry that is at once fantastical and utterly relatable." Metacritic assigned the season a weighted average score of 86 out of 100, based on 17 reviews, citing "universal acclaim".

For the second season, Metacritic collected 6 reviews and calculated an average score of 86, indicating "universal acclaim". On Rotten Tomatoes, 96% of 24 reviews are positive for the second season, with an average rating of 8.2/10. The critics consensus reads, "Undone broadens out into a family affair in a gorgeously trippy continuation that's as heady as it is moving."

=== Accolades ===
Year	Award	Category	Nominee(s)	Result	Ref.
2019	Annie Awards	Best General Audience Animated Television Production	"The Hospital"	Nominated	
2019	Critics' Choice Awards	Best Animated Series	Undone	Nominated	
2019	Gotham Independent Film Awards	Breakthrough Series – Short Form	Kate Purdy, Raphael Bob-Waksberg, Noel Bright, Steven A. Cohen, Tommy Pallotta	Nominated	
2020	Annecy International Animation Film Festival	Jury Award for a TV Series	"The Hospital"	Won	
2022	Hollywood Critics Association TV Awards	Best Streaming Animated Series or Television Movie	Undone	Nominated	
2023	Critics' Choice Awards	Best Animated Series	Undone	Nominated	
2023	Annie Awards	Best TV/Media – Limited Series	"Rectify"	Nominated	
2023	Writers Guild of America Awards	Animation	"Rectify"	Won	
