= Raphael Bob-Waksberg =

American comedian and writer (born 1984)

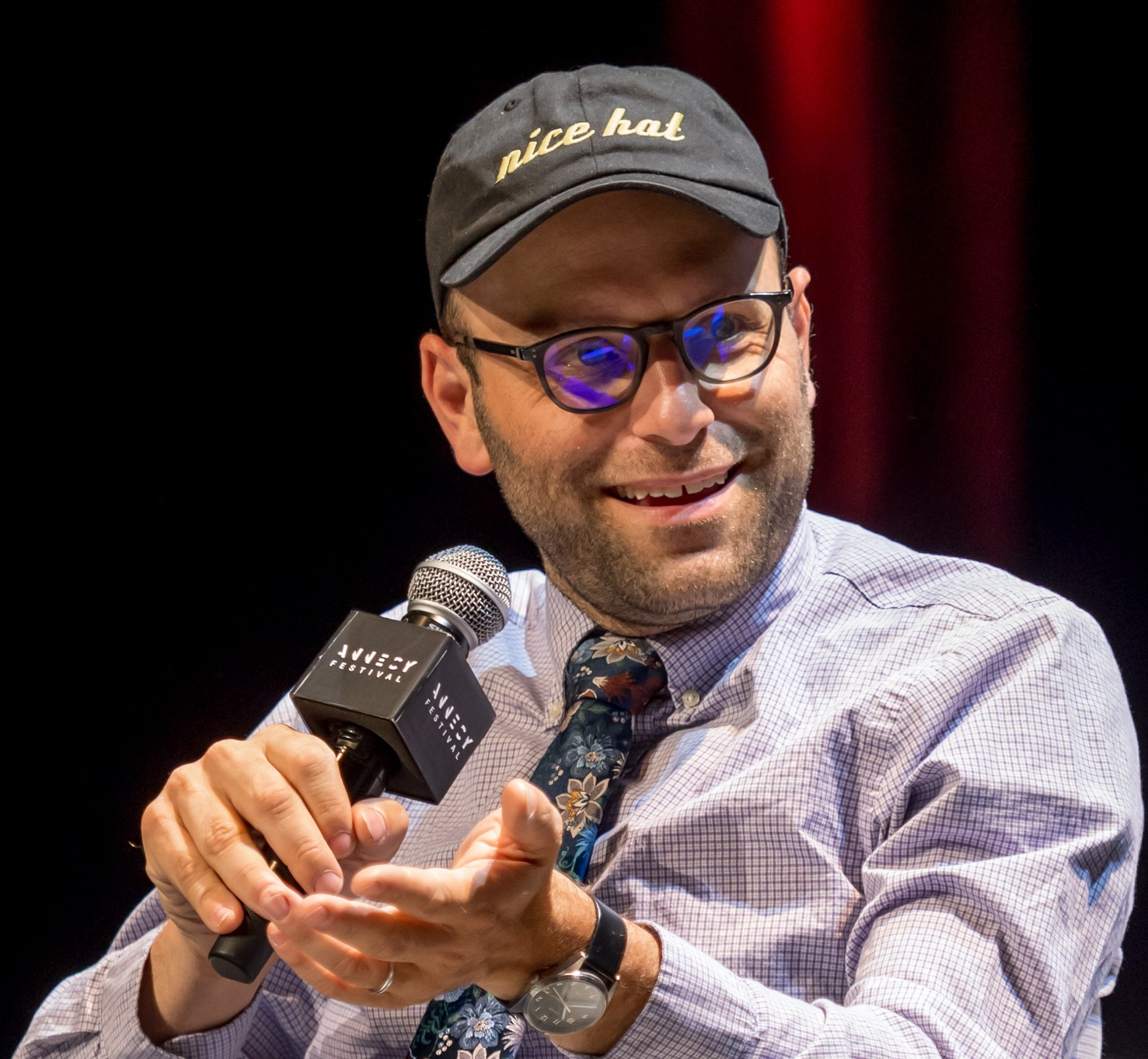
- Bob-Waksberg in 2025
- Born: Raphael Matthew Bob-Waksberg; August 17, 1984 (age 42); San Mateo, California, U.S.
- Education: Bard College
- Occupation: Voice actor; screenwriter; producer; actor; comedian
- Years active: 2002–present

Raphael Matthew Bob-Waksberg (born August 17, 1984) is an American comedian, writer, producer, actor, and voice actor. He is best known as the creator and showrunner of the Netflix animated comedy series BoJack Horseman (2014–2020), for which he received four Critics' Choice Television Awards and was nominated for two Primetime Emmy Awards.

With Kate Purdy, he co-created the Amazon Prime Video animated series Undone (2019–2022). He was also an executive producer and writer on the Netflix/Adult Swim animated series Tuca & Bertie (2019–2022), created by BoJack Horseman production designer Lisa Hanawalt.

In 2024, it was announced that Bob-Waksberg and Hanawalt reteamed to make Long Story Short, an animated comedy-drama about a family over time. The series premiered on August 22, 2025, to critical acclaim.

== Early life ==
Bob-Waksberg was raised in Palo Alto, California with his two sisters, Becky and Amalia.

Bob-Waksberg was raised in a Conservative Jewish family and his parents were involved in various Jewish causes. From 1982 to about 2010, his mother and grandmother ran a Judaica gift and book store titled Bob & Bob Fine Jewish Gifts and Books. His father, David Waksberg, helped Russian-speaking Jews emigrate to the United States and served as CEO of Jewish LearningWorks, a San Francisco-based religious education center, until his retirement in 2020. His father has stated, "When a friend asked me about [BoJack Horseman] after the first season, I said it was about teshuvah." When asked how his culture has influenced his art, Bob-Waksberg replied, "Asking me that question is like asking a fish how much being in water has affected it." He has implied that his family perceived comedy as a viable career path, stating in a Times of Israel interview,

Humor was a big part of my childhood. My family was full of comedians. We'd sit around the dinner table and try to one-up each other. It sometimes ended in tears, but usually in laughter...There was a warm and encouraging environment at home. My self-loathing and neuroticism are not because of my upbringing.

At 9 years of age, he was nicknamed "Raizin", and used the name until the age of 22.

He grew up 8 minutes away from Lisa Hanawalt, art collaborator and close friend. He was in the grade below hers at Gunn High School, which Bob-Waksberg described as "one of those schools where if you didn't take five AP classes and get 1600 on your SATs, you were considered subpar."

In 2019, Bob-Waksberg lamented that his high school class voted him "Class Clown" rather than "Funniest." When asked about the difference, he explained, "'Class Clown' is like, 'Ahhhhh, look at me, look at me!' Whereas 'Funniest' is like, 'Oh, a subtle wit.'" In a different interview, he stated, "I had ADD as a kid and often acted as the class clown. My teachers used to tell my mom, 'Raphael thinks he's a real comedian.'"

After high school, Bob-Waksberg attended Bard College in New York for playwriting. For three years while at Bard, he was roommates with Adam Conover, creator and host of Adam Ruins Everything. Conover and Bob-Waksberg were founding members of the sketch comedy group Olde English. Bob-Waksberg graduated with a degree in Theater and Performance in 2006.

Bob-Waksberg is vegan.

== Influences ==
Growing up, he was influenced by shows like The Simpsons, Seinfeld, and The Larry Sanders Show, stating:

"I was very moved by shows that combined things that were funny and sad. I remember liking Simpsons episodes in which emotions were central. And I thought family sitcoms like Full House, Growing Pains and Family Ties [the models for fictional sitcom "Horsin' Around" in BoJack] were actually kind of powerful. There was something wonderful about their cheesiness and warmth".

Hanawalt's art, specifically her animal-human hybrid characters, inspired him to create BoJack Horseman, and she eventually became the show's production designer and producer.

When talking about his influences that shaped BoJack Horseman, he cited The Simpsons, Daria, South Park, Who Framed Roger Rabbit, Archer, Animaniacs, The Tick, and the films of Don Hertzfeldt.

== Career ==
Bob-Waksberg is well known for creating the adult animated comedy series BoJack Horseman, which ran for six seasons. He performed various voice roles on the show.

As a member of the Olde English comedy troupe, he co-wrote and appeared in The Exquisite Corpse Project. He was the script doctor for The Lego Movie 2: The Second Part, which was released on February 8, 2019.

Bob-Waksberg's short story collection titled Someone Who Will Love You in All Your Damaged Glory: Stories was published by Knopf Publishing on June 11, 2019.

In March 2018, it was announced that he was co-creating an animated series for Amazon with Kate Purdy, which would be called Undone. The show revolves around Alma, a Mexican American woman who discovers a "new relationship with time" after a near-fatal car crash and uses this to learn more about the truth behind her father's death. It premiered on September 13, 2019, on Amazon Prime Video. In November 2019, the show was renewed for a second season.

In August 2024, Netflix announced Bob-Waksberg would create, write and executive-produce a new adult animated comedy series titled Long Story Short. The show was released on August 22, 2025, receiving strong reviews. The show was renewed for a second season, premiering in 2026.

== Television ==
Year	Title	Creator	Executive producer	Writer	Actor	Notes
2014–2020	BoJack Horseman	Yes	Yes	Yes	Yes	Creator; recurring voice role; wrote 11 episodes including: "BoJack Horseman: The BoJack Horseman Story, Chapter One", "BoJack Hates the Troops", "Brand New Couch", "Free Churro", "Nice While It Lasted"
2019–2022	Tuca & Bertie	No	Yes	Yes	Yes	Wrote two episodes
2019–2022	Undone	Yes	Yes	Yes	Yes	Co-created with Kate Purdy; wrote four episodes
2025–present	Long Story Short	Yes	Yes	Yes	No	Creator, showrunner
