= Making Fiends =

Making Fiends is a cartoon by Amy Winfrey which has had two incarnations:

- Making Fiends (web series), an online animated series (2003-2015).
- Making Fiends (TV series), a televised version of the above which premiered in 2008.
