= List of Making Fiends characters =

The following is a character list of both characters in the web series and the TV series of Making Fiends.

== Main ==
=== Vendetta ===
Vendetta
- Making Fiends character
- Vendetta in the TV episode "Charlotte's First Day".
- First appearance: "Charlotte’s First Day Part 1: New Student” (web series) "Charlotte's First Day" (TV series)
- Last appearance: "Thanksgiving” (web series) ’’Pony’’ (TV series)
- Created by: Amy Winfrey
- Voiced by: Aglaia Mortcheva

In-universe information
- Nicknames: She, her, The Pigtailed One (by Malachi in "Charlotte's First Day")
- Gender: Female
- Occupation: Student
- Family: Viktor (father); Violetta (mother)

Vendetta is a fictional main character in the web series and TV series of Making Fiends. She is created by Amy Winfrey and voiced by Aglaia Mortcheva, which gives her a Bulgarian accent. She first appeared in the web pilot in 2003. She appeared in all episodes, except in web episode 14, in which she stayed home from school.

Vendetta is Italian for "blood feud", and, true to her name, Vendetta is vindictive and cruel.

=== Role in Making Fiends ===
She is an evil green girl with a Bulgarian accent and the power to make fiends, both through stereotypical mad-scientist means and in the kitchen. She runs the town completely because everyone is afraid of her, except the new girl, Charlotte (or as Vendetta calls her "stupid blue girl"). Vendetta doesn't like her and wants to destroy her with her fiends. She is believed to be 9 or 10 years old.

=== Character ===
Voice

At first, Winfrey felt a little guilty for casting Mortcheva as the evil character. They tried to cast her as the voice actor for Charlotte, but it didn't work out as they planned it to.

Personality

Vendetta spends her time torturing the other children and using her giant bear-like hamster, Grudge, to get what she wants. She is narcissistic and rather histrionic, filling her home with pictures of herself, over-dramatizing anything negative that happens to her and desiring to be feared and respected. She constantly tries to destroy Charlotte, but her schemes are always foiled by Charlotte's kind obliviousness. She eats clams, beef jerky, and onions. She also drinks grape punch. She hates several things that are mentioned throughout the show. More often than not, she would use the word "stupid" to describe something she detests, such as Charlotte, Charlotte's grandmother, or a fiend who disobeys her. The only people she truly cares about are her parents, Viktor and Violetta, as shown in "Parentnapped" when she warned them to not hangout with Charlotte and when she rescued them from Charlotte's house after spending the day with her.

=== Charlotte ===
Charlotte
- Making Fiends character
- Charlotte in the TV episode "Marvin the Middle Manager".
- First appearance: "Charlotte’s First Day Part 1: New Student” (web series) "Charlotte's First Day" (TV series)
- Last appearance: "Thanksgiving” (web series) ”Pony” (TV series)
- Created by: Amy Winfrey
- Voiced by: Amy Winfrey

In-universe information
- Nicknames: Stupid girl, stupid little girl, stupid blue girl (all by Vendetta)
- Gender: Female
- Occupation: Student
- Family: Unnamed parents Charlene (grandmother)

Charlotte is one of the fictional main characters in the animated television series Making Fiends. She is the happy good character and the complete opposite to Vendetta. She is voiced and created by Amy Winfrey and first appeared in the pilot episode of the web series on July 14, 2003. The web series ran for 21 episodes between 2003 and 2005, and the television series aired on Nicktoons Network from October 4 to November 1, 2008.

Charlotte is oblivious to the fact that Vendetta hates her and is trying to destroy her with her homemade fiends. Charlotte will probably never notice that Vendetta tries to kill her. Somehow when Vendetta unleashes a fiend onto Charlotte, Charlotte always finds a way to make the fiend friendly.

=== Role in Making Fiends ===
Charlotte is a happy, blue, little girl from Vermont. She moved to Clamburg with her grandmother Charlene. Charlotte's parents are supposedly astronauts though it is also suggested that they are both dead. Charlotte believes her and Vendetta are best friends, but Vendetta wants to destroy her. Charlotte loves vegetables, cheese, pancakes, and most of all, Vendetta's fiends, which she thinks are cute animals, such as ponies and puppies. Charlotte also likes to play the tuba, play with the leaf blower, and pretend to be different things. Charlotte often uses phrases such as "tee hee!", "yippee!", and "hooray!". Charlotte's careless, innocent personality antagonizes Vendetta, and has even shown to be a danger to Clamburg in general in a few occasions. She even has broken into Vendetta's house or invited herself to other people's houses without invitation or permission. Many scenes of her innocent antics are designed to provoke sympathy for anyone who is involved on many occasions, many times driving the victim horribly frightened.

Charlotte has a pet hamster named Buttons and a scissors fiend named Buttons 2. Charlotte's grandmother Charlene is just like her, only older. They are both happy and see everything as friendly. They live together in a blue house with a rainbow surrounding it.

Charlotte attends Mu Elementary School in class room four with Mr. Milk teaching. She sits next to Marion, a nervous periwinkle overweight cowardly girl. She is believed to be 9 or 10 years old.

=== Character ===
Voice

Charlotte's voice is provided by the series creator, Amy Winfrey, in a high toned voice. Aglaia Mortcheva, the voice of Vendetta, was first tried as Charlotte, but did not fit in due to her Bulgarian accent.

Personality

Charlotte is an optimistic girl and could be described as too friendly; it is difficult for her to get angry as she sees everything as lovable. When Vendetta unleashes fiends onto her, Charlotte always ruins her plans by making the fiends do useful things. Charlotte is very naive and thinks Vendetta is her best friend. She likes to pretend to be different kind of things such as postage stamps or cheese. She can hold her breath for nine hours. She likes to sing songs about such things as being small, No. 2 pencils, and Vendetta. Charlotte loves mostly everything, though she does not like strawberries, as seen in web episode 8, and fleas, as seen in web episode 6.

=== Grudge ===
Grudge is Vendetta's giant hamster fiend. He fills the role of Vendetta's sidekick and thug enforcer. Grudge grunts and growls to express himself. In the TV series, it is expanded more on his feelings for Vendetta, showing that he really does care about her and her safety. In web episode 18, Grudge is replaced by Rubella, but is accepted again by Vendetta after helping her get rid of a music bear given from Rubella, but was fired again after hiccuping (he ate a music card given to Vendetta from Charlotte, so when he hiccuped, it played music. That was what made Vendetta replace him in the first place.) but is again accepted by Vendetta when he fends off her own wild fiends in web episode 20. Vendetta never refers to him by name, calling him Hamster. Charlotte calls him Grudge in web episode 7 and the TV series segments Shrinking Charlotte, and ‘’Shorts 1 (Dear Pretty Diary, Dear Stupid Journal)’’.

=== Mr. Milk ===
Mr. Milk is the teacher who has the misfortune of teaching Charlotte and Vendetta's class. He is very timid and rarely gets around to teaching due to his fear of Vendetta's reactions to his lessons. He speaks in a nervous, disjointed monotone and is afraid of the fanged red bird fiend that is constantly glaring at him. He fantasizes about being a Swiss banker and having a relationship with Mrs. Minty. He is voiced by Peter Merryman.

== Secondary ==
=== Charlene ===
Charlene is Charlotte's grandmother, whose personality is essentially that of an older Charlotte. She runs a candy shop that sells candy and auto parts; supposedly on television, she can make almost anything out of lemon drops and brake cables. She has a gigantic bookcase full of cookbooks in her kitchen, and says that she loves cookbooks and that they have "so many pretty pictures and nice recipes". Charlene does not appear in the web series. She is voiced by Amy Winfrey.

=== Giant Kitty ===
Giant Kitty is Vendetta's first-ever fiend. Charlotte spends a lot of time with him, much to Vendetta's dismay. He has an insatiable appetite, as seen in web episode 10 and 11. He despises taking baths, as seen in web episode 6. When he is brushed his contented purrs shake the school. He is voiced by Amy Winfrey.

=== Buttons ===
Buttons is Charlotte's pet hamster, and her "favorite hamster in the whole world". He resembles a miniature Grudge. He is also very scared of Vendetta and her fiends. According to Charlotte, Buttons likes peanuts and buttons. His prominent feature is the high-pitched squeal he makes when he is scared. Charlotte is seen to use him when playing with toys as well., and his cage also is in Charlotte's room. He is sometimes seen to be scared of Charlotte as she treats him more like a plaything than a pet. He is voiced by Amy Winfrey.

=== Buttons 2 ===
Scissor Fiend is a fiend Vendetta made to attack Charlotte that looks like a bird. He can cut things with his scissor-like beak. Charlotte thinks he is a puppy and made him a good friend and pet, him Buttons 2. He now enjoys cutting up construction paper. He sleeps in a drawer with many paper shreds in Charlotte's room.

=== Marvin ===
Marvin is a dark green schoolboy who frequently has his property or person vandalized by Vendetta's fiends. It is a running gag for Marvin to declare his loss or damage as a simple possessive exclamation, such as "My banana!", "My God!", "My cell phone!", "My spleen!" "My piano" etc. He is seen with his mother in the parent-teacher night. Marvin plays the tuba in Charlotte's marching band. He has 8 younger siblings, but he is the male out of all them. Marvin does not pay much attention at school and dreams of someday owning a skyscraper. He is voiced by Peter Merryman.

=== Marion ===
Marion is a medium overweight turquoise girl who sits next to Charlotte and talks quietly. She is friends with Malachi and the other classmates (except for Charlotte and Vendetta). She has been planning an escape to Canada for years, and tries to in at least one episode before being stopped by one of Vendetta's fiends; because of this, she has formed a fascination with mining. She also collects glass animals. She hates Charlotte because of her cheerfulness and when she gets mad, she screams and flees at any sign of danger. She absolutely hates Vendetta for the most part, going as far as hanging pictures of Vendetta on her wall and crossing her out. Marion plays the triangle in Charlotte's marching band. When she became best friends with Vendetta, she was blinded of all the power and tried to destroy Charlotte with a fiend she created on her own. And after her own house got destroyed, she moves into Charlotte's house, crying even louder. Her voice is more high-pitched than Charlotte. She is definitely not like all the others in Clamburg. She is timid, fearful, and most of all, cowardly. According to the Making Fiends web series DVD commentary, she has a crush on Marvin. She is voiced by Amy Winfrey.

=== Maggie ===
Maggie is a teal blue schoolgirl. She is always depressed because she has lost all hope due to Vendetta's fiends. She is convinced that she cannot change anything. She spends her free time writing poems. Her poems, much like her school projects, are about dismal topics. Although she fears Vendetta, she loathes Charlotte for being so happy. As revealed in the episode "Parents", her father is Mr. Onion Man. She is voiced by Amy Winfrey, although she is voiced by Madellaine Paxson, one of the writers for the series, in “No Singing”.

=== Malachi ===
Malachi is a dark purple schoolboy. He is Marion's friend. He speaks in Elizabethan English phrases and refuses to sing or use electronics because he believes it is blasphemous. He lives a puritan life and sees the conflicts between Charlotte and Vendetta as a struggle between good and evil, he even describes that the fiends are "unholy". He is fascinated with microwaves and thinks they work by evil magic. His parents were seen in "Parents". He is voiced by Peter Merryman.

=== Mort ===
Mort is a blue-gray schoolboy that is "friendly to the extreme". Mort is always ready to offer advice and opinions, none of which ever make sense. He has an irrational fear of soda, but a tragic love of soda cans. He was first seen in episode 19 of the web show being picked up by an ice cream fiend. Despite the fact that he was only seen rarely, he was supposed to become more developed in the television series. According to Nickelodeon's site, he is a boy who gives nonsensical advice but this has not been shown. He appears in the TV series and has only been seen in the background. He never talked in the TV series, but he screamed once. He is voiced by Peter Merryman.

=== Violetta and Viktor ===
Violetta and Viktor are Vendetta's parents that have been shrunk down and live in a hamster cage. Vendetta feeds them croutons and beans. It is possible that Vendetta used her parents to test the shrinking slug from "Shrinking Charlotte", though this is unconfirmed and is a theory. They are both unaware of Vendetta's cruelty and evilness. Both Violetta and Viktor dislike Charlotte since the day they spent together. She used them as toys and made them do insane things. They, however, liked her at the picnic and when they had a tea party over at Charlotte's house. They are voiced by Aglaia Mortcheva and Dave Wasson, respectively. They only appear in the TV series.

=== Mrs. Minty ===
Mrs. Minty (called Ms. Minty in ‘’Toupee’’ to define she is not married) is a substitute teacher. She is an elderly woman who, true to her name, is mint green. She refers to the classmates as "buttercups", "ducklings", and other diminutive terms of endearment. She seems to be unaware of Vendetta's reputation and abilities. In the web series, She also has a fear of Grudge. As seen in the episode "Toupee", Mr. Milk has a crush on her. She is voiced by Peter Merryman.

=== Mrs. Millet ===
Mrs. Millet is the lunch lady. A red frog fiend watches over her to make sure that she always serves nothing but clams, beef jerky, and grape punch. She openly disobeyed her fiend for two days before finally caving in. She is voiced by Amy Winfrey.

=== Mr. Gumpit ===
Mr. Gumpit is a purple nervous man that owns the Giant Pet Supplies shop. He is voiced by Dave Wasson and only appeared in the TV series.

=== Mr. Onion Man ===
Mr. Onion Man owns the local onion stand in Clamburg. He is seen to be the father or a relative to Maggie, as he sat with her at the parent-teacher night. He is voiced by Peter Merryman and only appeared in the TV series.

=== Charlotte's Parents ===
Charlotte's Parents were first mentioned in the television episode "Parents". They were only seen in a family picture. According to Charlotte and her grandmother Charlene, Charlotte's parents are astronauts on a space station. In the episode "Parents", Vendetta makes two look-a-like fiends to impersonate Charlotte's parents.

=== Rubella ===
Rubella is Vendetta's replacement fiend sidekick. She is a giant doll who resembles Frankenstein's monster. She eats material that is not food (like wood, glass and plaster) and talks in one and two-word sentences. She is named after a disease of the same name. She thinks of Vendetta as her friend rather than boss, and gave her a musical toy bear, which angered Vendetta and let her to abandonment. She is voiced by Elissa Calfin, and only appears in the web series.

=== No Singing Fiend ===
The No Singing Fiend is a fiend made by Vendetta to crush anyone, primarily Charlotte, if that person sings. He does not attack just singing people; it also attacked a radio that played music. He is voiced by Peter Merryman.

=== Smash ===
Smash is a fiend Vendetta made to flatten Charlotte in the TV episode "Smash". Smash was made with a purple liquid (liquid and measuring cup), Fiend mix, a cymbal monkey, and a picture of Charlotte so the fiend would only attack her. To Vendetta's dismay, the Smash smashed her and Charlotte together. Eventually, Grudge got smashed together with them when he tried to protect Charlotte and Vendetta. Smash was going to smash them one last time, but due to Grudge being smashed together with them they smelled bad. It is unknown what happened to Smash after he ran away due to the terrible smell. He is voiced by Peter Merryman.

=== Burly Fiend ===
The Burly fiend is a fiend made by Vendetta to steal things. When Vendetta told him to find her parents, Viktor and Violetta, but instead, he stole Charlene. His punishment was no snacks for the whole night and then the guard fiends took him away. He started sobbing when this happened. Like the No Singing fiend and Smash, He only appears in the TV Series, and is voiced by Peter Merryman.

== See also ==
- Amy Winfrey
- Web cartoon
- TV series
