= Making Friends =

Making Friends may refer to:

- Making Friends (album), a 1997 album by No Use for a Name
- Making Friends (film), a 1936 Fleischer Studios animated short film
- "Making Friends", a 1997 song by Lagwagon from Double Plaidinum
- "Making Friends," a young adult graphic novel series by Kristen Gudsnuk

== See also ==
- Making Fiends
