= The Buzz on Maggie =

American animated television series

- Genre: Comedy; Slapstick
- Created by: Dave Polsky
- Directed by: Dave Wasson
- Voices of: Jessica DiCicco; Cree Summer; Thom Adcox-Hernandez; David Kaufman; Brian Doyle-Murray; Susan Tolsky
- Theme music composer: Bob Thiele Jr.; Dillon O'Brian
- Opening theme: "Just the Way I Am" performed by Skye Sweetnam
- Composer: Adam Berry
- Country of origin: United States
- Original language: English
- No. of seasons: 1
- No. of episodes: 21 (42 segments)

Production
- Executive producers: Dave Polsky; Dave Wasson
- Running time: 22 minutes
- Production company: Walt Disney Television Animation

Original release
- Network: Disney Channel
- Release: June 17, 2005 – May 27, 2006

The Buzz on Maggie is an American animated television series created by Dave Polsky and directed by Dave Wasson for Disney Channel. The series centers on an ambitious and expressive tween fly named Maggie Pesky and her family and friends. The show is set in Stickyfeet, a city for insects located in a junkyard. While conceptualizing the series, Polsky wanted it to contain a playful view of adolescence and director Dave Wasson formed the overall look of the characters, being heavily influenced by early Walt Disney cartoon shorts. The Buzz on Maggie was Disney's first series to be fully animated in Adobe Flash, a process done by Bardel Entertainment and Future Thought Productions. The series was produced in widescreen, but was cropped to a 4:3 aspect ratio when aired on television due to Disney Channel's lack of an HD feed at the time.

The Buzz on Maggie premiered on June 17, 2005, and received positive reviews from television critics, many of whom praised its humor, voice acting, and writing. Despite this, a single season of 21 episodes was produced. The series aired its final episode on May 27, 2006.

The theme song "Just the Way I Am", performed by Canadian singer Skye Sweetnam, was also met with critical praise and a Daytime Emmy Award nomination in 2006. During its run, The Buzz on Maggie also received an Annie Award nomination for its character design.

== Plot ==
The main characters, Maggie (left) and her best friend Rayna (right).

The Buzz on Maggie follows Maggie Pesky (Jessica DiCicco), an expressive 13-year-old fly and her family; parents Chauncey (Brian Doyle-Murray) and Frieda (Susan Tolsky); older brother Aldrin (David Kaufman), younger brother Pupert (Thom Adcox); and baby sister Bella (Tara Strong). The family resides in an old milk carton in a suburban fly metropolis called Stickyfeet, which is located in a dump. Maggie has an ambitious and adventurous personality and aspires to become a rock star. Her approach to life often suffers unexpected consequences that put her in jeopardy, as she often follows her own impulses although they go against the rules or her parents' wishes. However, she ultimately learns her lesson, which was one of the core themes for the show's conception.

Maggie attends a junior high school called Buzzdale Academy with her best friend Rayna Cartflight (Cree Summer) and nemesis Dawn Swatworthy (Tara Strong). The school's staff includes the sneaky Principal Peststrip (Jeff Bennett), pompous History teacher Mr. Bugspit (Curtis Armstrong), and gruff STEM teacher Mrs. Wingston (Candi Milo). The Buzz on Maggie uses a slapstick comedy style and relies slightly on gross-out humor. It also includes several insect aspects, such as flies' appetite for spoiled and rotten food. The show features various references to pop culture and common themes, such as sibling rivalry and peer pressure, from a fly's point of view.

== Production ==
The concept of The Buzz on Maggie was created by Dave Polsky, a former writer on Scary Movie 2 and South Park. In an early interview for Animation World Network, he explained that the series utilizes a playful aspect at adolescence, naming it "individuality vs. conformity", and that Maggie has to learn how to pursue her agenda without alienating those she cares about. Dave Wasson, the creator of the animated series Time Squad, served as the director, and executively produced the series with Polsky, while Laura Perkins Brittain was the co-executive producer.

Wasson formed Maggie's character design and supported the use of Adobe Flash for animating the series. He told Animation Magazine that he was convinced Flash was a "good way to go" as he had had previous experience with the program, such as commercials and short films. The series became Disney's first to be fully animated in Flash. Following the cancellation of Kids' WB's ¡Mucha Lucha!, many animators from that series were hired to work on The Buzz on Maggie. For the character designs, Wasson was heavily influenced by early cartoon shorts by Tex Avery, Warner Bros. Cartoons and Walt Disney. He noted that the characters in The Buzz on Maggie have "a lot of 1930s touches" and wear white gloves, which is a direct homage to the cartoon shorts. The characters also have anime-inspired designs with oversized heads and large eyes. Wasson stated that the concept of Maggie living in a dump gave him a "lot of visual opportunities". Jorge Gutierrez supervised the character design and Roman Laney supervised location and prop design in addition to background paint. The animation was done by Bardel Entertainment and Future Thought Productions.

The series' theme song "Just the Way I Am" was composed by Bob Thiele Jr. and Dillon O'Brian, and performed by Canadian singer Skye Sweetnam. The song is about pride, acceptance and empowerment. Adam Berry did the show's score. Charlie Adler voice directed The Buzz on Maggie and helmed voice casting with Jamie Thomason. Newcomer Jessica DiCicco was cast as Maggie, her first main voice role on a television series, preceding her role on Loonatics Unleashed, which premiered the same year. The rest of the main cast included David Kaufman, Thom Adcox, Cree Summer, Brian Doyle-Murray and Susan Tolsky. Tara Strong voiced Maggie's nemesis Dawn, among other minor characters. The series had a few guest voice actors, such as Laraine Newman, Paul Rodriguez, and Jon Polito.

== Release ==
The Buzz on Maggie premiered on Disney Channel on Friday, June 17, 2005, with two back-to-back episodes. The next week, it moved to its regular timeslot in the channel's weekend block. Each half-hour episode consists of two different segments. The Buzz on Maggie aired for a single season, comprising 21 half-hour episodes. The final episode, containing the segments "Synchronized Flying" and "Roach Hotel", aired on May 27, 2006.

In fall 2005, The Buzz on Maggie was picked up by sister network ABC. The network began airing reruns of the show from September 17, 2005, to January 21, 2006, on the Saturday morning block ABC Kids. According to Nielsen Media Research, the ABC premiere acquired a 1.6 rating in the Kids 2–11 demographic, and a 1.4 rating in Tweens 9–14, as well as a 7% share in both demographics. The premiere was that timeslot's highest-rated broadcast in nearly three months across the block's three key demographics, Kids 2–11, Kids 6–11 and Tweens 9–14. During the ABC Kids broadcasts, the series carried an E/I designation.

== Episodes ==
All episodes are directed by Dave Wasson.

No.	Title	Written by	Storyboard by	Original release date	Prod. code
1	"The Flyinator" "Ladybugged"	Rachel Duguay Alicia Sky Varinaitis	Luke Cormican Julian Chaney	June 17, 2005	103
"The Flyinator": When Maggie can't see the same movies as Aldrin, she starts trying to be better than he is, so she and Rayna sneak into several violent movies to be better than him. "Ladybugged": When Maggie thinks up a theme for the school dance, it is quickly threatened by a new student, who apparently has a better theme.
2	"Funball" "The Science Whatchamacallit"	Dan Fybel and Rich Rinaldi Rachel Duguay	Tina Kugler Dave Knott	June 17, 2005	102
"Funball": Maggie devises a new game for her little brother Pupert to play so he can beat Aldrin at something, but when Aldrin starts to get the hang of the game things take an unexpected turn for the worse. "The Science Whatchamacallit": Maggie and Rayna try to get their partners, Eugene and Wendell (the twin beetles), who are really smart to do all the work for a science project, but when it comes time to present them, something unexpected happens.
3	"The Candidate" "Germy"	Rachelle Romberg Dave Polsky	Gabe Swarr Ricky Garduno	June 24, 2005	101
"The Candidate": Dawn faces some competition for the title of Homecoming Queen when Maggie gives a nerdy butterfly named Maria a makeover. "Germy": When Maggie wants to bring home a pet germ, her parents won't let her, so she sneaks it home, but faces a problem with training especially when her parents soon find out.
4	"Lunch Lady" "Love Stinks"	Dan Fybel and Rich Rinaldi Laura Perkins Brittain	Tina Kugler Luke Cormican	July 1, 2005	104
"Lunch Lady": Maggie accidentally gets the Buzzdale Academy's lunch lady and the other teachers to quit their jobs, causing the parents to take over the school. "Love Stinks": Maggie goes on a date with a stinkbug even though she doesn't want to.
5	"The Price of Fame" "King Flear"	Rachelle Romberg Manny Basanese	Ricky Garduno Wendy Grieb	July 8, 2005	105
"The Price of Fame": Maggie suggests that Pupert uses music to impress a girl. "King Flear": Maggie directs her classmates in a play for a drama competition.
6	"Rottingmuck Ranch" "Bella Con Carny"	Danny Warren and Josh Lynn Chris Bowman	Celia Weis Fred Gonzales	July 29, 2005	110
"Rottingmuck Ranch": Maggie wants to be Uncle Zeb's favorite relative again. "Bella Con Carny": Maggie has to spend bonding time with her little sister, Bella, after her mom is convinced she doesn't spend enough time with her.
7	"Bugsitting" "Le Termite"	Laura Perkins Brittain Rachel Duguay	Celia Weis Fred Gonzales	July 22, 2005	107
"Bugsitting": Maggie has to babysit, which conflicts with a promise she made to Pupert. "Le Termite": Maggie gets a job as a maid at a gourmet restaurant, but tells her parents that she is the head chef.
8	"Pieface" "The Hangout"	Dan Fybel and Rich Rinaldi Laura Perkins Brittain	Luke Cormican Julian Chaney	August 5, 2005	108
"Pieface": Maggie is determined to hit Principal Pestrip in the face with a pie as a homecoming prank. "The Hangout": Maggie and her brothers vie for control of her new hangout.
9	"Slumber Party" "Spelling Bees"	Will Berson Manny Basanese	Celia Weis Fred Gonzales	August 13, 2005	106
"Slumber Party": Maggie's parents decide to leave Maggie in charge of Pupert while they take Aldrin to a big flyball game. Unbeknownst to her parents, Maggie hosts a slumber party to which Rayna invites some nocturnal guests. "Spelling Bees": Maggie's favorite spelling team are holding auditions for a new speller, but only accepts famous bees, leaving Maggie to disguise herself as one.
10	"The Usual Insects" "Sister Act"	Chris Bowman Katherine Butler	Fred Gonzales Celia Weis	September 17, 2005	111
"The Usual Insects": Maggie and her friends' permanent records get sabotaged when Dawn becomes Principal Peststrip's office assistant. "Sister Act": Maggie and her baby sister Bella audition for a baby food commercial.
11	"Scum Bites" "Hooligans"	Julie Chambers and David Chambers Robin J. Stein	Julian Chaney Dave Knott	September 24, 2005	116
"Scum Bites": Maggie challenges Dawn on the school's charity fund drive selling Scum Bites candy. "Hooligans": Maggie reports a school bully by tattling to his parents.
12	"The Big Score" "Scare Wars"	Dan Fybel and Rich Rinaldi Rachel Duguay	Fred Osmond Troy Adomitis, Calvin Suggs and Gabe Swarr	October 22, 2005	113
"The Big Score": Maggie and her friends head to the human world to go trick-or-treating. "Scare Wars": The Pesky children attempt to out scare one another and this year Maggie is the target.
13	"Metamorpho Sis" "Radio Free Buzzdale"	Alicia Sky Varinaitis Chris Bowman	Celia Weis Luke Cormican	November 12, 2005	114
"Metamorpho Sis": Maggie volunteers to become a child's mentor, but has some regrets about the decision when she is matched up with a cranky cocoon. "Radio Free Buzzdale": Maggie joins Principal Peststrip's crusade to stop an anonymous kid DJ who has gained unauthorized access to the school's radio station.
14	"Those Pesky Roaches" "Bugtillion"	Beth Seriff and Geoff Tarson Lloyd Garver	Luke Cormican Tina Kugler and Calvin Suggs	December 6, 2005 (Germany); December 17, 2005 (USA)	115
"Those Pesky Roaches": When Maggie and her brothers go on strike for bigger allowances, their parents hire roaches to do their chores for them. "Bugtillion": When Rayna is rejected for Bugtillion classes, Maggie tries out herself as part of a plot to avenge her friend.
15	"Hot for Tutor" "Sick Days, Inc."	Dan Fybel and Rich Rinaldi Sharon Schatz Rosenthal	Troy Adomitis Tina Kugler and Julian Chaney	December 1, 2005 (Germany); January 7, 2006 (USA)	112
"Hot for Tutor": Maggie and Rayna have a crush on the same math tutor. "Sick Days, Inc.": Maggie and Rayna sell kits that help students pretend that they are sick to raise money for tickets to a rock concert.
16	"Scout of Order" "Ant Mines"	Sharon Schatz Rosenthal Robin J. Stein	Wendy Grieb Ricky Garduno	November 28, 2005 (Germany); February 11, 2006 (USA)	109
"Scout of Order": Maggie falls for Pupert's scout headmaster. "Ant Mines": Maggie writes a story on the allegedly oppressed conditions of some ants in a human kid's ant farm for the school newspaper, but when she finds out that their lives are better than what she expected, she writes a false article.
17	"Faking History" "Bugs on the Brink"	Robin J. Stein Lloyd Garver	Wendy Grieb Ricky Garduno	December 2, 2005 (Germany); March 4, 2006 (USA)	118
"Faking History": Maggie cuts corners on her history diorama project so that she can enjoy her spring break, but matters get complicated when her father befriends her history teacher. "Bugs on the Brink": When humans threaten to tear down Stickyfeet to make way for a strip mall, Maggie disguises Rayna as an endangered beetle.
18	"Training Day" "Honey Striper"	Dan Fybel and Rich Rinaldi Sharon Schatz Rosenthal	Wendy Grieb Ricky Garduno	December 8, 2005 (Germany); March 18, 2006 (USA)	117
"Training Day": When Aldrin injures his wing while winning a scooter for Maggie, Maggie agrees to do all his chores out of guilt while nursing him back to health in time for his team's football game. "Honey Striper": Maggie and Rayna volunteer to work in a hospital in order to visit an injured rock star.
19	"Raccooooon!" "Best Best Friends"	Brandon Sawyer Nina Bargiel and Jeremy Bargiel	Fred Gonzales Sahin Ersöz	December 12, 2005 (Germany); April 22, 2006 (USA)	119
"Raccooooon!": A raccoon causes trouble for the citizens of Stickyfeet. "Best Best Friends": Rayna's old best friend moves to Stickyfeet, driving a wedge between Rayna and Maggie.
20	"Peskys Unclogged" "Club Hopping"	Katherine Butler Manny Basanese	Fred Gonzales Fred Osmond	December 13, 2005 (Germany); May 6, 2006 (USA)	120
"Peskys Unclogged": Maggie is embarrassed when her family is all set to demonstrate the Pesky age-old tradition of clogging on a local cable TV network. "Club Hopping": Maggie joins every club in her school to avoid a math test.
21	"Synchronized Flying" "Roach Hotel"	Brooke Cadorette Chris Bowman	Wendy Grieb Ricky Garduno	December 14, 2005 (Germany); May 27, 2006 (USA)	121
"Synchronized Flying": Maggie tries everything except the truth to avoid being Rayna's synchronized flying partner. "Roach Hotel": Aldrin tries to sabotage the family vacation that was planned by Maggie.

== Reception ==
=== Critical response ===
It's the voices ... that hit the humor home, from Jessica DiCicco in the starring role to Cree Summer's wonderfully deadpan pal Rayna to the recognizable gruffness of Brian Doyle-Murray as her dad. Let's hope the gang from Stickyfeet stays.

— Roger Catlin, Hartford Courant

The Buzz on Maggie received positive reviews from television critics. Jeff Hidek of Star-News viewed it as "Miss Spider's Sunny Patch Friends meets The Proud Family" and named it "by far the most entertaining of this summer's new offerings". Roger Catlin of Hartford Courant wrote that it stands out from other shows on Disney Channel by "being a little sassy and sharp, and a whole lot funnier" compared to other shows on the channel. He wrote that the channel "gets back into the race dominated by Cartoon Network offerings ... and a Nickelodeon roster ... with an offering just as hip and well designed". Catlin commended the voice acting and the "sharp" writing, stating that the former factor "hit[s] the humor home". The Philadelphia Inquirer critic David Hiltbrand noted that although the show includes "a little" gross-out humor, "it's reasonably tasteful by adolescent standards". Although he called the animation "a little substandard", he was positive to its premise. AllMovie's Hal Erickson deemed the fly concept unoriginal, but said that the show "set[s] itself apart from such earlier endeavors". Erickson regarded Maggie's "strong, forceful attitude" a positive role model for kids. A critic for Observer-Reporter deemed it "suitably silly", and Robert Lloyd of Los Angeles Times called it "delightful".

At the time of its premiere, Gail Pennington of St. Louis Post-Dispatch named the show one of the "Tops of the night". Diana Dawson, writing for Spartanburg Herald-Journal, considered it an "inspiring show for fun-loving tweens". Kevin McDonough of Lawrence Journal-World wrote that The Buzz on Maggie has a "decent" balance between cartoon anarchy and Disney's you-go-girl sermonizing. He praised the title character's "bugged-out status", writing that it prevents the stories from being "too cute". Jeanne Spreier of The Dallas Morning News graded The Buzz on Maggie with a B, citing its "simple" plots and "clean" dialogue, and regarded it as "perfect cartooning" for children. Similarly, the show's theme song "Just the Way I Am" received positive reactions; Hiltbrand called it "great", and Dawson wrote that "every episode explodes with the dynamic theme song".

=== Awards and nominations ===
In 2005, Jorge Gutierrez was nominated for the Best Character Design in an Animated Television Production award at the 33rd Annie Awards, for his work in the episode "Bella Con Carny", but lost to Ernie Gilbert from The Fairly OddParents. The next year, Bob Thiele Jr. and Dillon O'Brian received a nomination for Outstanding Original Song for the theme song "Just the Way I Am" at the 33rd Daytime Emmy Awards, but lost to the song "Sunshine" from The Young and the Restless.

Award	Category	Nominee(s)	Result	Ref.
33rd Annie Awards	Best Character Design in an Animated Television Production	Jorge Gutierrez; (for "Bella Con Carny")	Nominated	
33rd Daytime Emmy Awards	Outstanding Original Song	Bob Thiele, Jr.; Dillon O'Brian; (for "Just the Way I Am")	Nominated	
