= Making Fiends (TV series) =

American animated television miniseries

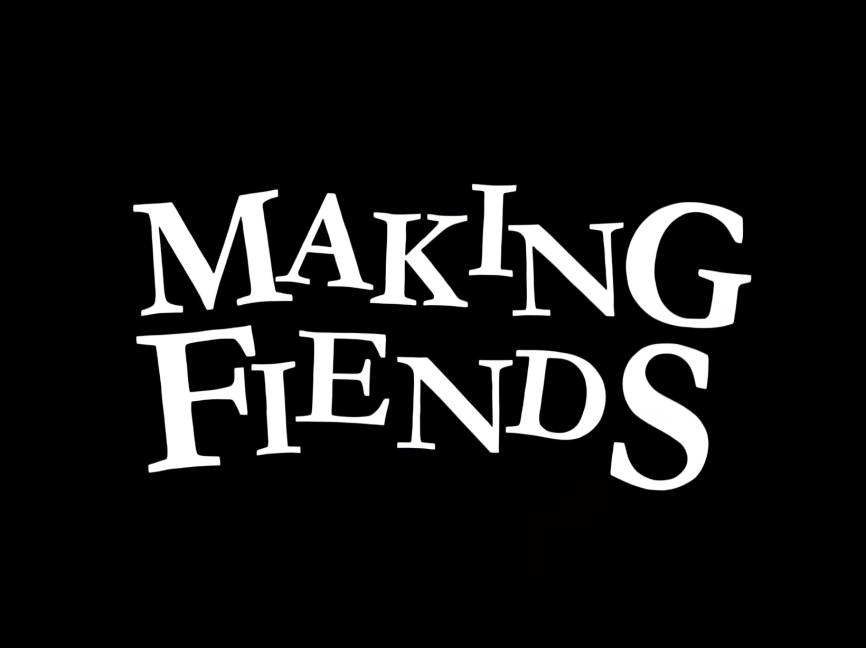
- Genre: Black comedy Horror comedy Dark fantasy Musical
- Created by: Amy Winfrey
- Based on: Making Fiends by Amy Winfrey
- Written by: Amy Winfrey; Matt Negrete; Madellaine Paxson; Peter Merryman
- Directed by: Dave Knott; Martin Cendreda
- Voices of: Amy Winfrey; Aglaia Mortcheva; Peter Merryman; Dave Wasson
- Theme music composer: Amy Winfrey
- Opening theme: "Making Fiends"
- Composer: Ego Plum
- Country of origin: United States
- Original language: English
- No. of seasons: 1
- No. of episodes: 6 (18 segments)

Production
- Executive producers: Eric Coleman; Matt Mahaffey
- Running time: 21 minutes (7 minutes per segment)
- Production company: Nickelodeon Animation Studios

Original release
- Network: Nicktoons Network
- Release: October 4 – November 1, 2008

Related
- Making Fiends (web series)

Making Fiends is an American animated television miniseries based on the web series of the same name. The series ran from October 4, 2008 to November 1, 2008, on Nicktoons Network. The series is Nickelodeon’s first animated series to be based on a web series, and follows the evil Vendetta and the new happy but dim-witted girl, Charlotte, at school in the gloomy town of Clamburg. Charlotte unintentionally irritates and annoys Vendetta. As a result, Vendetta attempts to destroy her with fiends, but she always fails due to Charlotte's luck.

The series is created by former South Park animator Amy Winfrey and produced by Nickelodeon Animation Studios, with Cyber Chicken Animation Studio and DQ Entertainment Limited animating the show in flash animation. Winfrey voices Charlotte and her grandmother Charlene, among other characters. Character designer Aglaia Mortcheva is the voice of Vendetta. All of the voice actors from the web cartoon reprise their roles for the TV series, with the addition of a new cast member and crew member, Dave Wasson, who previously created Time Squad for Cartoon Network.

== Plot ==
(l-r); Grudge, Vendetta, Marvin, Maggie, Mort, Charlotte, Marion, Malachi, and Mr. Milk.

The story is based around Vendetta, a malevolent green girl with the power to make fiends "hideous things." She has unleashed these fiends onto the coastal town of Clamburg to bring it under her reign of terror. What once was a thriving tourist destination, has become a grim, forbidding place with stores shuttered and the citizens living under the watchful surveillance of Vendetta's fiends.

Charlotte, a new girl at Vendetta's school, arrives determined to make a friend. An "impossibly cheery" optimist, Charlotte rapidly becomes the foil and tormentor of the morose and vindictive Vendetta, by insisting on befriending her.

Vendetta is unable to elicit anything but saccharine friendliness out of Charlotte, and so makes the first of many fiends that are specially designed to destroy the newcomer. After demonstrating that her oblivious joy makes her immune to the dangers and terrors of all of the fiends, Charlotte declares that her and Vendetta are "going to be friends forever and ever."

In subsequent scenes, Charlotte displays an ability to change the nature of some fiends into helpful friends, further frustrating Vendetta's efforts to undo her. Being "oblivious to all that is bad and mean in the world", Charlotte neither acknowledges the damage caused by Vendetta's fiends, nor the threat Vendetta herself poses over Clamburg, and in the end ends up turning Vendetta's fiends into harmless friends. Nearly all of the residents, including Vendetta's parents, begin fearing Charlotte more than they do Vendetta within the first six episodes.

Charlotte never discovers or understands that Vendetta doesn’t like her, and Vendetta is never able to get rid of Charlotte. While this conflict is never resolved by the end of each episode, some minor developments appear to continue between episodes, like the introduction of Buttons 2 and an enormous statue that Vendetta has raised of herself.

== Characters ==
Charlotte and Vendetta attend Mu Elementary School in class room 4. Mr. Milk, a soft-spoken nervous man, is their teacher. Charlotte lives with her grandmother Charlene while her astronaut parents are away on space missions, while dialogue implies that they are actually dead. Vendetta lives with her tiny parents, Violetta and Viktor, who live in a hamster cage.

== Music ==
Series creator Amy Winfrey wrote all of the songs featured on the show. After recording the demo track for each song, they would be sent to series composer, Ego Plum, for production.

Plum is noted for using unusual sounds and instruments in his music. Examples include: dripping water, toy pianos, baby rattles, plastic xylophones, and even a goat. On occasion, other Making Fiends crew members would pitch in to help play the various instruments, lending the music a "home-made" feel similar to the original web series.

== Production ==
A daughter to an employee at Nickelodeon was a fan of Making Fiends. She showed the website to other Nickelodeon employees. They contacted Winfrey to see if she was interested in televising the series.

Winfrey is often asked where she got the idea for Making Fiends. She is not sure, but liked to sketch "strange and fantastical" animals in college. She is often inspired by "silly-looking and improbable" animals. She has a parrot and a pet flounder at home, and once had a salamander.

In early 2004, Nick started negotiations with Winfrey to develop the series into a half-hour television program. During the long negotiation and development period, Winfrey continued to create new web episodes independently, and sell related merchandise in her own online "souvenir shop". In 2006, Nickelodeon began distributing many of the web cartoons as streaming video on their own TurboNick platform, and later as podcasts available on iTunes.

The series was picked up for a first season of television episodes in late 2006. Production began in January 2007 and the show started airing in 2008. The show was set to premiere on Nickelodeon, but Nickelodeon decided to cancel its plans for a broadcast on their parent channel, and instead gave this new series to its sister channel Nicktoons Network (along with the show, Random! Cartoons).

The series premiered on October 4, 2008 and ended on November 1, the same year on Nicktoons Network. It received generally favorable reviews by critics. Making Fiends carries a rating of TV-Y7 (FV – fantasy violence for some episodes). The series aired in the United States, Australia, New Zealand, and in the Netherlands.

The writing team of Making Fiends consisted of only four people; Winfrey, Peter Merryman, Madellaine Paxson, and Matt Negrete. In the show's studio, there was a special "thinking couch" for the development of new ideas.

Charlotte's house in the web series (top) and in the TV series (bottom).

=== Animation ===
The animation for the series was outsourced to Cyber Chicken Animation Studio in South Korea and DQ Entertainment Limited in India. The character designs are kept from the web series, with some changed details; such as cleaner lines and brighter eyes. Despite the fact that both versions use Adobe Flash to create animation, the television series has smooth animation and a vivid color palette. This is because the characters and backgrounds in the web series were made of overlapping JPEG files, and that the television series had access to an actual budget due to being a show on a television cable network. Noticeably, the colors still go outside the outlines, which is a unique stylistic choice. Every building was changed; in the web cartoon most buildings were gray, but were changed to different colors for the TV version. Each house represents a character. Vendetta's house is dark green and Charlotte's blue, matching their own skin color.

=== Cast ===
Creator Amy Winfrey voices Charlotte, her grandmother, Charlene, Mrs. Millet, Maggie (in most appearances), Buttons, Giant Kitty, and Marion. Character designer Aglaia Mortcheva, who also was in the crew for the web series, voices Vendetta and her tiny mother, Violeta. Winfrey's husband, Peter Merryman, voices Marvin, Malachi, Mort, Mrs. Minty, Onion Guy, Grudge, and Mr. Milk. And also, most fiends on the show. The series' supervising producer and director, Dave Wasson, voices Vendetta's tiny father, Viktor, and Mr. Gumpit. Madellaine Paxson, who wrote for Kim Possible and Johnny Test, voiced Maggie in the episode "No Singing". Winfrey, however, voices Maggie in all other appearances.

=== Cancellation ===
The series was cancelled on November 1, 2008 after one season. The show premiered with little to no promotion or press release. At one point, it was the highest-rated original program on Nicktoons Network. After the series ended, reruns continued to air until late 2016.

== Episodes ==
No.	Title	Directed by	Written by	Storyboarded by	Original release date	Prod. code
1	"Charlotte's First Day"	Dave Knott	Amy Winfrey	Mike Moloney	October 4, 2008	MF101
1	"A Fiendish Friend"	Martin Cendreda	Story by : Amy Winfrey; Teleplay by : Peter Merryman	Christo Stamboliev	October 4, 2008	MF102
1	"Super Evil"	Dave Knott	Peter Merryman	Mike Moloney	October 4, 2008	MF106
The new happy but dim-witted girl Charlotte comes to the town of Clamburg with her cheerful grandmother, Charlene. Charlotte starts at Mu Elementary School right away. Mr. Milk welcomes Charlotte and tells her to take a seat. Then, Vendetta enters the classroom and Charlotte starts talking to her. Already now, Charlotte annoys Vendetta, even though she is only nice. Vendetta decides to bring a fiend to Show and Tell the next day. Charlotte brings her hamster, Buttons, her "favorite hamster in the whole world", and a rock, that Vendetta "gave" to her. In reality, she threw it. Vendetta brings a tentacled fiend that was supposed to eat Charlotte, But the Giant Kitty saves her. Charlotte tries to introduce the red giant kitty to Buttons, but the red giant kitty chases Buttons. Charlotte loves to pretend to be different kind of things. Vendetta suggests to "pretend to be dead". Charlotte pretends to be a ghost and starts "haunting" her at Le Mayonnaise, the fancy restaurant, from "beyond the grave". Vendetta decides to go home. Then she hears ghostly sounds from the attic and walks up and sees Charlotte holding and rattling chains like a ghost. Vendetta decides to make a scissor fiend to destroy her, who she befriends. Charlotte scores "super evil" in a magazine quiz, while Vendetta scores "mostly evil". After this, Vendetta wants to see Charlotte's evil ways, so she starts following her. She gives her the chance to make her own fiend in her kitchen. Charlotte made her own fiend Mr. Huggles, a pink bear-like fiend that loves and hugs everybody and everything. In the end, it turned out that Charlotte did not look at the questions for the quiz, she only drew a picture of a flower, house and sun.
2	"Vegetables"	Martin Cendreda	Story by : Amy Winfrey; Teleplay by : Madellaine Paxson	Jody Schaeffer	October 5, 2008	MF103
2	"Toupee"	Martin Cendreda	Amy Winfrey	Jill Colbert	October 5, 2008	MF112
2	"Mama Vendetta"	Dave Knott	Matt Negrete	Rob Fendler	October 5, 2008	MF105
Charlotte notices that the lunch lady, Mrs. Millet, only serves Vendetta's favorite food; beef jerky, grape punch, and clams. Charlotte wants to have vegetables on the menu, so she tries to serve some new food. She first adds tries to serve vegetables, much to Vendetta’s disapproval. She later makes beef jerky, clam and grape punch casserole, which Vendetta likes at first, but rejects due to it having carrots. A day later, Vendetta makes some vegetable fiends that scare the students. Charlotte calms down the vegetables and teaches them how to sing a song about vegetables, which makes Vendetta scream in fear. Mr. Milk has a crush on Ms. Minty, but he does not know how to talk to her. Charlotte gives him an apple as a gift. Jealous, Vendetta decides to give him an evil toupee that will supposedly make all of his dreams come true, but only if he destroys Charlotte. Mr. Milk tries to do so several times, but is too nice to do so. He throws the toupee into the sea and goes back to being timid and sad. To remind the residents of Clamburg how powerful she is, Vendetta erects a giant statue of herself. Charlotte likes to swing on the statue's "pretty elbow". To keep Charlotte away from her statue, she creates some exploding pigeon fiends. But they think Vendetta is their mother, much to her annoyance. Charlotte takes the role as their father. In the end, Vendetta's statue gets destroyed. Despite this, it is seen again in later episodes.
3	"Shrinking Charlotte"	Martin Cendreda	Amy Winfrey	Christo Stamboliev	October 11, 2008	MF104
3	"Parents"	Martin Cendreda	Madellaine Paxson	Jody Schaeffer	October 11, 2008	MF111
3	"No Singing"	Dave Knott	Amy Winfrey	James Suhr	October 11, 2008	MF110
Vendetta makes a slug fiend to shrink Charlotte, but accidentally shrinks herself and Grudge, too. Charlotte is thrilled being just as small as Buttons. Vendetta makes some "gianting squids" to make her as big as a giant to destroy Charlotte. Charlotte misses her parents, who are "in a better place, up there," supposedly a reference to their jobs as astronauts. Vendetta decides to make fiend look-a-likes for her. Charlotte thinks they are her real parents, which stops the fiends from wanting to eat her. They start having fun together. In the end, they are eaten by whales, but Grudge accidentally fires a cannon, which makes Charlotte think that they have returned to the space station. Vendetta is extremely tired of Charlotte's happy songs, so she makes a fiend to smash people or things that sing. However, Maggie reads a sad poem about a lost kitten, and suddenly Charlotte doesn't feel like singing. Vendetta does everything she can to make her sing again. However, when Vendetta starts singing in an attempt to make Charlotte sing, she triggers the fiend, who starts chasing Vendetta.
4	"Puppies! Puppies! Puppies!"	Martin Cendreda	Matt Negrete	Jill Colbert	October 18, 2008	MF107
4	"Shorts 1 (Dear Pretty Diary, Dear Stupid Journal)"	Dave Knott	Peter Merryman & Amy Winfrey	Rob Fendler	October 18, 2008	MF108
4	"Marvin the Middle Manager"	Dave Knott	Amy Winfrey	James Suhr	October 18, 2008	MF114
Vendetta wants to protect all her favorite places from Charlotte, so she uses her "fiend multiplier" to multiply her guard dog fiends. However, since Vendetta left the "fiend multiplier" in the same room as Charlotte, Charlotte finds a way to take care of all the fiends – multiply herself. An advertisement for Clamburg's onion stand; Charlotte and Vendetta share their versions of the day with Charlotte’s diary and Vendetta’s journal; Charlotte sings about why she loves Clamburg; a tourism advertisement for Clamburg, sabotaged by Vendetta. Vendetta decides she's too powerful to sit in school all day. She hires Marvin to run things in her absence and Charlotte decides to help him. They do everything on the list; scare the students, feed the fiends, and so on. But Marvin is not up to the task of destroying Charlotte, while Charlotte thinks it will be fun.
5	"Parentnapped"	Martin Cendreda	Peter Merryman	Christo Stamboliev	October 25, 2008	MF113
5	"Smash"	Martin Cendreda	Madellaine Paxson	Jody Schaeffer	October 25, 2008	MF109
5	"New Best Friend"	Dave Knott	Matt Negrete	Ricky Garduno	October 25, 2008	MF115
Vendetta and Grudge drove home in their new car. Vendetta sees her tiny parents on a picnic with Charlotte and gets out of the car. She is angry at her parents for going on a picnic with Charlotte. She sends a fiend to bring them back home, but he comes back with Charlotte's cheerful grandmother, Charlene. Vendetta writes a note to Charlotte about "trading parents". Charlotte is playing with Vendetta's parents all day, and Charlene is making sure that Vendetta has everything she needs at school, cleans her house, and knits scarves for Vendetta and Grudge. Vendetta gets tired of Charlene and decides to take her parents back. All of Clamburg is getting ready for the Pancake Festival, Charlotte creates a marching band with four performers. Marvin plays a big tuba, Marion plays a little triangle, Maggie plays a kazoo, and Mort plays his drum. Vendetta makes a fiend called Smash to flatten Charlotte, but ends up smashed together with her. Smash comes to flatten Charlotte, but also chases Vendetta as she is conjoined with Charlotte, scaring her. During the Pancake Festival, Grudge comes to stop Smash from flattening Charlotte and Vendetta, but ends up conjoined with them. Vendetta decides to electrocute herself, Charlotte and Grudge in order to get separated again. Vendetta's house gets invaded by termite fiends she made to destroy Charlotte, so her house gets tented for three days. Vendetta decides to move in with Marion, who wants to leave Clamburg. She is terrified of Vendetta, but she also thinks it's nice to have a powerful friend. Marion makes her own fiend that eventually destroys her house. Marion moves in with Charlotte, who decides to show the submarine to Vendetta. Marion begins to sob as the episode ends.
6	"Tornado"	Dave Knott	Peter Merryman	James Suhr	November 1, 2008	MF116
6	"Shorts 2 (The Land of Cheese)"	Dave Knott	Peter Merryman & Amy Winfrey	Rob Fendler	November 1, 2008	MF117
6	"Pony"	Martin Cendreda	Amy Winfrey	Jill Colbert	November 1, 2008	MF118
Vendetta makes a tornado fiend to destroy Charlotte's house, but unintentionally attaches it to her own house. Charlotte's antics eventually drive Vendetta crazy. Meanwhile, Grudge gets blown away by the tornado and ventures through harsh environments to get back home and save Vendetta. A commercial for giant pet supplies runs; Charlotte dreams about a world made out of cheese with her "best friend" Vendetta, who destroys it with a fiend later; Charlotte sings a song about living on the moon, while Vendetta sings about its downside. Charlotte wants Vendetta to make a pony for her, so she makes a giant pony fiend. It invades Clamburg and terrorizes the citizens. Vendetta is happy until everybody hides in her house for safety, so she must get rid of "John" the female pony if she wants to get back in her own house. The episode ends with an eagle-like fiend carrying John away as Charlotte waves goodbye. The citizens congratulate her, but she tells them to leave her alone or she will call her fiend back.

== Reception ==
"It's not gross or political or even gory, and although it's dark -- and looks dark -- it's a beginner's sort of dark. Because no matter how cynical Vendetta's outlook or how random the results of her machinations seem, she'll never ever actually win."

— KJ Dell Antonia

The show received positive reviews from critics, with KJ Dell Antonia at Common Sense Media gave the show 4 out of 5 saying "the dialogue is simple, the animation is intentionally scribbly and dark, and the color palette is limited. The whole thing looks like a kid's flip book. And yet it's funny -- funny for the kind of parents who think Dexter's Laboratory is funny, and funny for any kid old enough to handle the weirdness of rooting for a patently bad girl who will never win and with nothing but a secret, lingering fear of monsters under the bed."

Dan Heching at Tilzy said "clever and irreverent, Making Fiends is a fairly classic series of short episodes. [...] Nothing is left untouched; torture, animal attacks, musical numbers and April fools' jokes. [...] Character development is kept largely to a minimum, in keeping with the classic simplicity of the cartoon, [that is] Vendetta vs. Charlotte."

== Marketing and merchandise ==
Before the series was picked up by Nicktoons, Winfrey sold Making Fiends T-shirts and DVDs with the web episodes at her "souvenir shop". Official t-shirts by Nicktoons were later released.

A 2-disc complete series DVD set was released on June 9, 2009 with the first season including all six episodes. Although it is shown in the gift shop at the Making Fiends official website, it is only available for purchase at Amazon.com in DVD-R format. The entire series is also available for digital purchase at Amazon Prime Video.

== See also ==
- Amy Winfrey
- Lenore, the Cute Little Dead Girl
- Web cartoon
- List of characters
