= Aglaia Mortcheva =

Bulgarian animator and illustrator

- Born: Sofia, Bulgaria
- Occupations: Voice actress, animator, and illustrator
- Years active: 1999–present
- Website: http://www.aglaiamortcheva.com

Aglaia Mortcheva (Bulgarian: Аглая Морчева) is a Bulgarian animator, illustrator, painter, and voice actress. She is best known for her portrayal of Vendetta on the animated web series Making Fiends and its television miniseries. Mortcheva is also a professor of art and animation at California State University, Northridge.

== Biography ==
Mortcheva was born and raised in Sofia, Bulgaria. At age six, she started working as a child actress and later became an artist at age fourteen. At age twenty six, she moved to Los Angeles, California, where she currently lives with her husband. They have two children born in 1998 and 2002.

She worked on shows such as South Park. In 2003, Mortcheva was the voice of Vendetta on Amy Winfrey's web project, Making Fiends. The series was televised in 2008, in which Mortcheva was a character designer. In 2008, Mortcheva published a short film titled When I am Sad, which she wrote, animated, and provided the voice for the main character.

Her first art book, Aglaia Mortcheva: Drawings and Illustrations: Volume 1, was released on August 30, 2009.

== Filmography ==
Year	Title	Role	Notes
1999	South Park: Bigger, Longer & Uncut		Animator
2003–2005	Making Fiends	Vendetta	Voice
2008	Making Fiends	Vendetta/Violetta	Voice/Character designer
2008	When I am Sad	The Girl	Voice/Animator/Writer
2015	Baking Beans	Beandetta	Voice (archived recordings)
2020	Hooray for Hell	Pastry thief	Voice
