= Making Fiends (web series) =

2003 animated web series by Amy Winfrey

- Genre: Black comedy Comic science fiction Musical; Science fantasy Comedy horror Thriller; Slapstick; Dark fantasy
- Created by: Amy Winfrey
- Written by: Amy Winfrey
- Voices of: Aglaia Mortcheva; Amy Winfrey; Peter Merryman
- Countries of origin: United States Bulgaria (Voices and bilingual school)
- Original languages: English; Bulgarian (April Fool's)
- No. of seasons: 3
- No. of episodes: 24

Production
- Animators: Amy Winfrey; Peter Merryman; Martin Cendreda; Eliza Chincarini; Neil Ishimine; Heather Wilbur
- Running time: 1-6 minutes

Original release
- Release: July 14, 2003 – April 1, 2015

Related
- Making Fiends (TV series)

Making Fiends is an American-Bulgarian flash animated web series created by Amy Winfrey. It follows the interactions between Vendetta, a villainous tomboy that regularly makes terrible creatures called "fiends", and Charlotte, a cheerful and gullible girly-girl who thinks that Vendetta is her best friend. Charlotte unintentionally irritates Vendetta. As a result, Vendetta attempts to kill her with fiends, but she always fails due to Charlotte's luck.

The site was first put up on June 3, 2003, and the series debuted with its first episode on July 14, 2003. In 2004, the series was licensed by Nickelodeon, and eventually the episodes were broadcast on Nick.com's TurboNick. The series would later be uploaded to Amy Winfrey's YouTube page in 2012, re-rendered in HD widescreen. A 20-minute animated horror comedy cartoon television series was greenlit in 2008 on Nicktoons, which aired only 6 episodes (each consisting of 3 segments) before being canceled. Nickelodeon Animation Studio, Cyber Chicken Animation Studio and DQ Entertainment Limited produced the TV series.

== Characters ==
- Vendetta: (Voiced by Aglaia Mortcheva) Vendetta is a sociopathic, narcissistic and histrionic young tomboy with the power to create "fiends" with a book of recipes. She is moss green and wears pigtails that tend to fly up when she yells. She constantly squints her eyes for emphasis. She spends her time reading magazines and tormenting the other children in her school with her monstrous creations. She uses her dangerous fiends to get what she wants, such as her constant assistant Grudge who helps her give out physical punishment. She develops a one-sided rivalry with Charlotte, and often attempts to kill her. Vendetta almost always uses fiends for her attempts, but she has also done methods like tricking Charlotte into wearing concrete shoes and walking off the edge of a pier. She despises music, to the point of being hurt by it. Her diet consists of almost entirely beef jerky, clams, and grape punch. She speaks in a thick Bulgarian accent and has somewhat broken English. Vendetta appeared in every episode except for episode 14.
- Charlotte: (Voiced by Amy Winfrey) A light-blue, optimistic girly-girl from Vermont. She has curly hair and wears a hairbow. Charlotte believes that all creatures are cute and harmless, and everybody is a potential friend. She tries to find the best in any person or situation, and ignores anything she finds strange. She is convinced that Vendetta is her new best friend, much to Vendetta's chagrin. Charlotte's naivete and oblivious invulnerability results in many of Vendetta's plans for torment to backfire. Vendetta seeks to kill Charlotte, but is never successful. A running gag is that Charlotte sees projectiles thrown at her as gifts. Almost every episode includes her singing a song that she makes up on the spot. Charlotte has the uncanny ability to hold her breath for nine hours. She has a pet hamster named Buttons. Charlotte is the only character present in every web episode.
- Grudge: (Voiced by Peter Merryman) Vendetta's giant hamster fiend, mistaken for a bear by Charlotte and a dog by Mrs. Minty. Grudge does not speak, but rather grunts and growls, and is Vendetta's constant sidekick. He assists Vendetta in making fiends and giving threats to those who defy her. Vendetta almost never refers to him by name, simply calling him "hamster". Unlike most other fiends, he seems to actually care for Vendetta and her safety, despite her harsh treatment of him. Like Rubella and the cat fiend, he is also capable of eating inedible objects. In episode 18, Grudge is replaced by Rubella. In episode 20, Vendetta takes Grudge back after he protects her from rogue fiends.
- Mr. Milk: (Voiced by Peter Merryman) The teacher of Charlotte's and Vendetta's class. He is a beige, nearly bald man with a tie and glasses whose few remaining hairs stick up when he is scared or surprised. He speaks in a nervous, disjointed monotone due to Vendetta's domination, and is forced to do Vendetta's bidding out of fear of her. He is also afraid of the fanged red bird fiend that is constantly glaring at him. Mr. Milk is probably inspired by Caspar Milquetoast, a comic book character remarkably similar to him. He also physically resembles the South Park character Herbert Garrison, notable because Amy Winfrey worked on the first few episodes of South Park. He has a tenor singing voice.
- Marion: (Voiced by Amy Winfrey) A pale blue, overweight girl who sits next to Charlotte and speaks in a nasal whisper. She has a collection of glass animals, and has many allergies. A cowardly girl, she was the first student to talk to Charlotte and warn her about Vendetta. She appears to be friends with Malachi, and her DVD commentary implies that she has a crush on Marvin.
- Malachi: (Voiced by Peter Merryman) A grey boy who follows Charlotte around school, giving her dire cautions about Vendetta and her fiends, which Charlotte does not understand and ignores. He is Marion's friend. He is a Puritan; he speaks in complicated, archaic English and refuses to sing because it is blasphemous.
- Marvin: (Voiced by Peter Merryman) A taller, dark green boy who almost always starts his sentences with "my", usually because his belongings are always stolen from him, but also as a verbal tic. Once an episode, he will exclaim "My [possession]!". He is very unlucky, slow and weak. According to Marion's commentary, he brought a banana to show and tell because his father works at the banana factory.
- Maggie: (Voiced by Amy Winfrey) A grey girl who sits next to Marvin and doesn't speak until "Wonderful Wintry Day", when she cogently remarks, "Charlotte's dumb". In the background, she is seen writing.
- Rubella: (Voiced by Elissa Calfin) Vendetta's replacement fiend sidekick. She is a giant doll who resembles Frankenstein's monster. She eats non-edible food (like wood, glass and plaster) and talks in one- and two-word sentences. She is named after the disease Rubella. She thinks of Vendetta as her friend rather than boss, and gave her a musical toy bear, which angered Vendetta and let her to abandonment.
- Giant Kitty: (Voiced by Amy Winfrey) Also called "Hellcat". A giant red cat fiend, and the first fiend to appear in the web cartoon. He often attacks the students when they're outside, and has an immense appetite, able to eat anything that will fit in his stomach. He is temporarily tamed by Charlotte, where Charlotte brushes and cares for him, although he gets angry again when Charlotte says he needs a bath.
- Buttons: Charlotte's pet hamster, her "favorite hamster in the whole world", first seen in episode 2. He is known for making a high-pitched noise at the sign of any danger.
- Scissor Fiend: A fiend Vendetta made for Charlotte that resembles a bird and can cut things with its scissorlike beak. Charlotte thinks it's a puppy, and it ends up being her friend instead of killing her. It has a talent for making Valentines gifts. It tries to rescue Charlotte even in the most dangerous situations. In the TV series, Charlotte names it Buttons 2.
- Mrs. Minty: (Voiced by Peter Merryman) A substitute teacher. She is an elderly woman who, true to her name, is mint green. She refers to the classmates as "buttercups", "ducklings", and other diminutive terms of endearment. She seems to be unaware of Vendetta's reputation and abilities, not unlike Charlotte. Her main debut is in episode 9, and she is also seen in episodes 20 and 21, but does not talk.
- Mort: A blue boy with glasses that was seen in episode 19, being picked up by an ice cream fiend. He is added as another student in Mr. Milk's classroom in the TV series.

Other recurring characters include the Mrs. Millet the lunch lady, and her pet red frog-like fiend on the lunch counter that controls her. There are also other grey, unnamed students, a girl with clips in her hair that is often seen screaming and waving her arms in the episode "Vegetables", and a boy with a baseball cap, both of which are in the classroom next to Vendetta's.

== Series overview ==
Season	Episodes	Originally aired	
Season	Episodes	Season premiere	Season finale
1	10	July 14, 2003; March 6, 2012 (YouTube)	June 29, 2004; June 20, 2012 (YouTube)
2	10	September 11, 2004; June 27, 2012 (YouTube)	October 26, 2005; September 13, 2012 (YouTube)
Extras and specials	4	December 23, 2003	April 1, 2015

== Episodes ==
=== Season 1 (2003–04) ===
No. overall	No. in season	Title	Original release date
1	1	"Charlotte's First Day Part 1: New Student"	July 14, 2003
It's Charlotte's first day at her new school. Immediately, she comes across the giant fiend cat, but is fascinated rather than scared. She walks into her new classroom and meets Vendetta and Grudge. Charlotte wants to be friends with Vendetta, but the other girl despises her and wants her gone. Charlotte is completely oblivious to this and remains so for the rest of the series.
2	2	"Charlotte's First Day Part 2: Show and Tell"	July 14, 2003
For "Show and Tell", Vendetta brings the students outside and releases a monkey-like fiend that steals and eats the students' belongings. Vendetta tells the students to "enjoy" and leaves with Grudge to get ice cream. Charlotte then proceeds to "introduce" her hamster, Buttons, to the giant fiend cat, which results in chaos as the cat chases Buttons around the schoolyard.
3	3	"Vegetables"	August 19, 2003
Charlotte notices that the lunch menu is the same everyday; clams, beef jerky, and grape punch. Malachi tells Charlotte not to question it, because they are Vendetta's favorite foods. Charlotte complains that there are no vegetables on the lunch menu though. When Vendetta hears about this, she gets the idea to bring vegetable fiends to lunch the next day.
4	4	"A Fiendish Friend (a.k.a. Scissor Fiend)"	September 25, 2003
Charlotte wants to play and pretend with Vendetta, still oblivious to Vendetta's disdain for her. Angered, Vendetta makes her first attempt to kill Charlotte. She gives Charlotte a small fiend with a sharp scissor-like beak that slices up objects that get in its way, hoping it will harm her. However, the plan backfires when Charlotte befriends the fiend and it becomes loyal to her.
5	5	"Halloween"	October 23, 2003
It's Halloween, and Charlotte dresses up as Vendetta. Vendetta tells Charlotte if she wants to act like her, she should play in traffic and drink bleach. Later, Vendetta creates a fiend intended to be addicted to blood, but when Charlotte feeds it a sugar cookie, the fiend becomes addicted to the snack instead.
6	6	"Kitty Kitty Kitty"	December 13, 2003
Charlotte befriends the giant kitty, brushing him and causing him to purr loudly. This annoys Vendetta, and she tries to make the cat fiend angry again with "super big fleas...with knives!" However, the cat fiend eventually runs off after Charlotte mentions it needs to take a bath.
7	7	"Shrinking Charlotte (a.k.a. Shrinking Slug)"	February 22, 2004
Vendetta creates a slug-like fiend designed to shrink the objects it touches and then consume them. It successfully works on Charlotte, but Vendetta accidentally touches the slug fiend, causing her to shrink as well, followed by Grudge who swats the fiend away to save Vendetta. Vendetta later comes back in super large size after making a growing fiend, but things go haywire when the Giant Red Kitty ends up eating the shrinking slug and the growing fiend.
8	8	"Birthday"	April 22, 2004
Charlotte keeps bugging Vendetta and the other students about her birthday. In response to this, Vendetta decides to host a party for Charlotte that contains many hazardous fiends disguised as typical party supplies.
9	9	"Substitute Teacher"	June 2, 2004
When Mr. Milk is sick, Mrs. Minty, the substitute teacher, tries to teach the class in more traditional ways, which angers Vendetta. After Mrs. Minty kicks Grudge out of the classroom due to not allowing animals, Vendetta leaves and returns with fiends who take her away. In addition to this, Vendetta also forces Mr. Milk to come back to class despite being sick.
10	10	"Eaten Part 1: Pet Sitting"	July 9, 2004
Charlotte shows Vendetta a canary named Frederick that she's watching for her neighbors. Charlotte suggests that she could watch over Vendetta's "pets". This gives Vendetta an idea, so she lies to Charlotte that she is going to Florida during the weekend and needs somebody to feed her fiends. Charlotte happily agrees to watch after them, so Vendetta gives her a list of things to feed the fiends, each task putting Charlotte in great danger. At the end, Charlotte gets eaten by the red giant cat.

=== Season 2 (2004–05) ===
No. overall	No. in season	Title	Original release date
11	1	"Eaten Part 2: No More Charlotte"	September 11, 2004
Charlotte was eaten by the Giant Kitty fiend much to the delight of Vendetta, but Vendetta is eaten as well and ends up trapped in the Giant Kitty's stomach with Charlotte.
12	2	"Election"	October 12, 2004
Charlotte celebrates Chester A. Arthur's birthday and says that the class should have a president. Vendetta is eager to run for class President, believing it will give her more power, but Charlotte nominates Marion instead of Vendetta, changing her plans. Vendetta nominates Marvin, and uses force to have him elected.
13	3	"Invisible"	November 27, 2004
Vendetta brings an invisible fiend to attack Charlotte, however, Charlotte accidentally kills it with a kebab. Out of curiosity, she then turns herself invisible by drinking Vendetta's invisible drink.
14	4	"Wonderful Wintry Day"	December 17, 2004
Mr. Milk is doing attendance, and sees that Vendetta isn't present. Suddenly, a large brown fiend breaks through the door and brings Mr. Milk a letter from Vendetta, saying that she will not come to school that day. Surprised, Mr. Milk seals the red bird fiend in a jar, and brings his students outside. Pleased with the absence of Vendetta, Mr. Milk started singing in a tenor-like opera voice and gets his students (sans Malachi) to sing with him.
15	5	"Valentine's Day"	February 3, 2005
During Valentine's Day, Charlotte sends a Valentine's Day card to Vendetta and, out of irritation, she creates a big heart fiend who literally wants people's hearts.
16	6	"Rainy Day Schedule"	March 17, 2005
Vendetta calls for a "Rainy Day schedule" because of the precipitation outside. She brings out a Rainy Day Activity Box because Charlotte pleads for it unknowing of what would happen. Vendetta opens the box and out come many red fiends which make very loud, screeching noises and cause malice.
17	7	"April Fool's"	April 3, 2005
During April Fool's Day, Vendetta plots to send Charlotte into space because of Charlotte's annoying April Fool's jokes. Vendetta, however, gets tied onto the rocket that was going to be launched into space because of her colorblind fiends. Charlotte wants to join her and they both get launched into space. Note: This whole episode is in Bulgarian dialogue and subtitled with tongue-in-cheek English subtitles.
18	8	"Rubella (Part One)"	May 20, 2005
Charlotte gives Vendetta a music card which is very irritating to Vendetta. To stop the noise, Grudge ate it, but when he hiccups the song plays again. Later, Vendetta is trying to make a fiend, which fails because Grudge accidentally dropped an important ingredient. Vendetta kicks Grudge out because she thinks he is not very helpful and she brings a new fiend to assist her named Rubella.
19	9	"Concrete Shoes (Part Two)"	September 1, 2005
Vendetta and Rubella enjoy themselves, during a Charlotte-free day, by attacking the other children with her fiends. At Vendetta's house, she is happy because of the successes she had with her fiends and she considers Rubella a friend, but not for long.
20	10	"The End of All Things (Part Three)"	October 15, 2005
Charlotte returns in this series finale, being tossed in the classroom by a friendly squid named Janet. Vendetta is shocked, and she freaks out and rants at Charlotte. Charlotte responds by saying that she had a good time and wants to do something special for Vendetta. Vendetta, desperate to destroy Charlotte without help, goes home to mix up a potion that will turn anything into a fiend with one dip. Vendetta plans to turn Charlotte's hamster, Buttons, into a hideous fiend. The potion will take one hour to turn "fiendish", so Vendetta sets the timer and leaves to steal Buttons, only to come back and find her potion gone with a letter from Charlotte, saying that's using the green dip to paint Vendetta's present, a giant statue of Vendetta that comes to life and chases Vendetta around. The bucket and brush used to paint the statue then come to life, and bring all the buildings (including Charlotte's house) to life, which leads Vendetta to reunite with Grudge before both then fall off of a cliff. Vendetta awakes to find herself surrounded by flames and a shadowy figure resembling Charlotte and assumes herself to have died and gone to Hell, only to learn that Charlotte has saved her and Grudge by building a boat to save her and their class. As they sail away, Charlotte expresses glee at how she and (a horrified) Vendetta will be alone together for "months and months".

=== Extras and specials (2003–15) ===
No. overall	No. in season	Title	Original release date
6.5	6.5	"Christmas Bonus"	December 23, 2003
The Christmas bonus consists of two different versions of a song, "Nice" sung by Charlotte, and "Naughty" sung by Vendetta. In the nice version, Charlotte sings about how she wishes she were a Christmas tree, and how she could be decorated. Vendetta's version, the naughty, has Vendetta also singing about how she wishes Charlotte were a Christmas Tree, and Vendetta elaborates on how she would abuse Charlotte in that state.
21	11	"Thanksgiving Treat"	November 24, 2005
A Thanksgiving-oriented epilogue to episode 20. After sailing on a boat for 15 minutes, Vendetta complains that she is hungry. Charlotte stocked the boat with stuffing and mashed potatoes, but Vendetta only wants clams. After Charlotte begins to sing about clams to try to get them on the ship, Vendetta starts to consider walking the plank, but instead decides to put Charlotte on what seemed like a deserted island but is really the head of a giant turkey. Note: Although this episode isn't included on the Season 2 DVD set, it's still referred to as episode 21 on both the Making Fiends website and YouTube.
22	12	"Making Friends"	April 1, 2012
An episode made for 2012's April Fool's Day. It is said to have been made by fiend named Foggington Dunkel III. The fiend was doing some housekeeping around the Making Fiends website, and didn't like Vendetta's personality, so he tried to "fix" it with a new episode. In the episode, Vendetta and Charlotte have their roles reversed; Vendetta wants to be Charlotte's friend, while Charlotte makes fiends and tries to kill Vendetta.
23	13	"Baking Beans"	April 1, 2015
An episode made for 2015's April Fool's Day. It features the characters as beans. Charlotte, now named Charbean, is using the slide on the school playground as Vendetta, now named Beandetta, and Grudge, now named Budge, are watching, annoyed. Beandetta gives Charbean some vicious beans that carry her off the playground. Charbean is happy and sings a tune about beans. Some time later, Beandetta seen at her house with Budge when Charbean shows up. Beandetta is shocked as she was supposed to be eaten by the beans. Charbean then happily explains that "through a series of fun and improbable events", the beans got canned, and shows a can of refried beans.

== Games ==
- Halloween Treat (Released October 25th, 2004)

A flash game that is put on the website on Halloween (web series style.) Unlike the Christmas Bonus and Thanksgiving Treat, its URL is not available on the official website year-round, although it can be played here (renamed Pumpkin Plunkin on Nick.com). At the beginning of the game, the rules are explained by both Charlotte and Vendetta. The overall objective is to throw pumpkins at Charlotte while she moves around the screen in various costumes. The maximum is 30 and there are different end screens depending on how many pumpkins you throw at Charlotte.

== DVD releases ==
The Season One DVD was first shipped out on December 10, 2004.

Season One
Set Details	Special Features
10 episodes; 1-disc set (DVD); 1.33:1 aspect ratio; Languages: English (With subtitles); French ("Vegetables"); Mandarin ("A Fiendish Friend"); Japanese ("Halloween")	Optional commentaries for 4 episodes; "Charlotte's First Day Part 1: New Student" (with Charlotte and Vendetta); "Charlotte's First Day Part 2: Show and Tell" (with Marion); "Shrinking Charlotte" (with Vendetta and Grudge); "Substitute Teacher" (with Mr. Milk); "Kitty Kitty Kitty" audio replaced with a computerized speech simulator; "Birthday" can be played with Pig Latin Subtitles; "Eaten Part 1: Pet Sitting" is narrated by Big Bunny; Fiendish Sketches (Fiendish Beginnings & Episode Tidbits); Making of Making Fiends Featurette; The Christmas Bonus Shorts

The Season Two DVD was first shipped out on December 14, 2005.

Season Two
Set Details	Special Features
10 episodes; 1-disc set (DVD); 1.33:1 aspect ratio; Languages: English (With subtitles); Bulgarian ("April Fool's")	"Eaten Part 2: No More Charlotte" has the main characters with beards; "Election" has a Patriotic Version that has stars and the American Flag in the background and Mr. Milk dressed as the Statue of Liberty; "Invisible" has an Extra Invisible version that has the main characters (sans Charlotte) completely invisible except their facial features; "Wonderful Wintry Day" has the characters in fancy clothes; "Valentine's Day" has a Super Pretty Version! where there are different colors for both the cast and backgrounds; "Rainy Day Schedule" replaces the rain with snow and the word "Rain" is replaced with a robotic tone saying "Snow"/"Snowy"; "Rubella" redesigns the characters as muffins; "Concrete Shoes" replaces the normal backgrounds with pictures from France; "The End of All Things" has an alternate ending with Vendetta moving to Florida and never seeing Charlotte again.; Playable Halloween Game; Fiendish Sketches

In 2006, 2008, 2009 and 2010, a message was posted on the front page saying that a fiend was to be temporarily placed in charge of the site. On April Fool's Day, the main menu had a bite taken out of it, and the fiend was there to explain that he got hungry and ate some episodes, but fixed them. As a result, the episodes 4, 6, 11, 18, 19, and 20 were replaced with their alternate DVD versions as an April Fool's joke.

== Broadcast on TurboNick ==
Nickelodeon bought the series and did a successful test run of Making Fiends on its web-based TurboNick. Few restrictions were made by the network execs when they made the deal, they told Amy Winfrey, "Just don't mention Hitler, and don't hit people on the head".

Winfrey conceded to a few small changes. For example, a classroom poster that read "A is for Alimony" had to be changed. She was stumped for a while on what A should be for. Aglaia would pop into Winfrey's office and suggest things, such as Alcoholism. They settled on "A is for Abomination".

== See also ==
- Amy Winfrey
- Lenore, the Cute Little Dead Girl
- Salad Fingers
- TV series
- List of characters
