= Dave Wasson =

American animator (born 1968)

- Born: Dave Wasson; September 11, 1968 (age 57); Hot Springs, Arkansas, U.S.
- Education: California Institute of the Arts
- Occupations: Animator; storyboard artist; director; producer; writer; voice actor
- Years active: 1988–present
- Known for: Time Squad; The Cuphead Show!
- Website: davewasson.net

Dave Wasson (born September 11, 1968) is an American animator, storyboard artist, director, producer, writer, and voice actor. Wasson created the Cartoon Network original series Time Squad, before going on to develop Star vs. the Forces of Evil as director, writer, and executive producer. He also served as director and writer of the series, supervising director of Making Fiends, and executive producer and director of the series The Buzz on Maggie. He is also the author and illustrator of the children's book The Big Ideas of Buster Bickles. Wasson is also a developer and executive producer of The Cuphead Show! for Netflix.

== Early life ==
Wasson studied film making and animation at the California Institute of the Arts.

== Career ==
Wasson created a series of shorts at Nickelodeon for Oh Yeah! Cartoons, one of which, Max & His Special Problem, won him a Daytime Emmy Award in 1999 for Production Designer. Wasson created the Cartoon Network animated series Time Squad, which ran from 2001 to 2003. He has co-written, storyboarded, and directed a number of the shorts for the series Mickey Mouse Shorts. Wasson was the supervising director, supervising producer, and voice actor on Making Fiends. He was the executive producer and director of The Buzz on Maggie at Disney. He has also directed many animated commercials for the company Acme Filmworks located in Hollywood, California.

In 2025, Wasson was listed amongst the animation industry workers who had lost their homes due to the January 2025 Southern California wildfires.

== Credits ==
=== Television ===
- Catschool - Supervising Director, Executive producer, Storyboard Artist
- Mighty Mouse: The New Adventures (1987-1989) - Layout
- What a Cartoon! (1996) - Character Layout ("Buy One, Get One Free")
- Oh Yeah! Cartoons (1998-2001) - Creator, Director, Writer, Art Director ("Max and His Special Problem", "Tales from the Goose Lady")
- Time Squad (2001-2003) - Creator, Director, Executive Producer, Writer
- The Buzz on Maggie (2005-2006) - Director, Executive Producer
- Making Fiends (2008) - Director, Supervising Director, Supervising Producer, Art Director, Voice actor
- The Mighty B! (2008-2011) - Character Designer
- Star vs. the Forces of Evil (2015-2019) - Developed by, Story by, Supervising Director, Executive Producer
- The Cuphead Show! (2022) - Creator, Developed by, Executive Producer, Writer, Theme Song Composer

=== Movies ===
- Cloudy with a Chance of Meatballs - Animator
- Cool World - Animator, Character Layout, Character Design
- Down with Love - Animation Director, Title Sequence
- Space Jam - Animator

=== Voice acting ===
- Making Fiends - Additional voices
- Oh Yeah! Cartoons - Max
- The Cuphead Show! - The Devil's Henchman, Mr. Telephone, Muffin Ice Cream Man
