= Time Squad =

American animated television series

- Genre: Science fiction comedy; Science fantasy
- Created by: Dave Wasson
- Written by: Dave Wasson; Carlos Ramos; Michael Karnow
- Directed by: Dave Wasson
- Voices of: Pamela Adlon; Mark Hamill; Rob Paulsen
- Composers: Michael Tavera; Billy Martin (Season 2)
- Country of origin: United States
- Original language: English
- No. of seasons: 2
- No. of episodes: 26 (53 segments)

Production
- Executive producer: Dave Wasson
- Running time: 22 minutes
- Production company: Cartoon Network Studios

Original release
- Network: Cartoon Network
- Release: June 8, 2001 – November 26, 2003

Time Squad is an American animated television series created by Dave Wasson for Cartoon Network and the tenth of the network's Cartoon Cartoons. It follows the adventures of Otto Osworth, Buck Tuddrussel, and the robot Larry 3000, a trio of hapless "time cops" living in the far distant future who travel back in time attempting to correct the course of history. During their adventures, they run into major historical figures, who have taken a drastically different course of life than history dictates. The mission of the Time Squad is to guide these figures onto the correct path and ensure the integrity of the future.

The series premiered during Cartoon Network's marathon block "Cartoon Cartoon Summer" on June 8, 2001, and ended after two seasons on November 26, 2003, airing 26 episodes in total. In the course of its run, the series received five Annie Award nominations. Creator Dave Wasson described the series as "a C-average student's approach [to history]—a CliffsNotes version of what historical characters did and giving it a twist." It is the final Cartoon Network original series to premiere during Betty Cohen's tenure before her departure from the network.

Time Squad was the first Cartoon Network original series to be entirely produced by Cartoon Network Studios, no longer a division of Hanna-Barbera following the death of William Hanna in 2001. The show features music from Michael Tavera, who would later make music for ¡Mucha Lucha!, Lilo & Stitch: The Series, Yin Yang Yo! and The Secret Saturdays.

== Premise ==
Set in the year 100,000,000 AD on a satellite orbiting Earth, Time Squad follows the adventures of Buck Tuddrussel (voiced by Rob Paulsen), a muscular and dim-witted officer of the law; Larry 3000 (voiced by Mark Hamill), a serious and stern robot; and Otto Osworth (voiced by Pamela Adlon), an eight-year-old orphan history buff, as they travel together backwards in time to set right the course of history as it unravels.

The Time Squad organization is set up to ensure that history is maintained and the future protected. According to Larry 3000, "time is like a rope", and, as it is woven at one end, ages and gradually unravels and frays at the other. In the context of the show, this often means that historical figures have made different, sometimes anachronistic, choices in life, and as such will not be able to fulfill the role that history says they fulfilled. According to creator Dave Wasson, "We started by basically knowing what a guy did in history, then found the most outlandish way he could go wrong".

Future Earth is now a peaceful utopia where all nations of the world have merged into one, and according to Tuddrussel, Earth has "no more war, no pollution, and bacon is good for your heart". Despite this cheerful vision of the future, the space station on which the characters live and from which they travel to the past is remarkably dystopic. It features a shooting range, a terrarium and a prison for repeat offenders, but it is dank, outdated (for the time) and unclean. Mostly this seems to be down to officer Buck Tuddrussel, a scruffy and immature perennial bachelor, who nevertheless happens to be the station's most senior officer.

The only other official member of Buck's unit is Larry 3000, a translator robot and former diplomat who was rendered more or less obsolete when all of the world's nations merged. Buck's mindless machismo clashes with Larry's effete sensibilities, and the two bicker terribly.

When they encounter Otto Osworth, an orphan from the 21st century, he is quickly recruited as he is the only one on the team with any enthusiasm or competence for the job. Neither of the other two are particularly willing to listen to his advice, and Otto must often resort to trickery to make sure the mission is completed.

=== Characters ===
==== Main ====
- Otto Osworth (voiced by Pamela Adlon) is a near-sighted orphan picked up by Tuddrussel and Larry, taken on board due to their incompetence and his impressive historical knowledge. Otto has been compared to Sherman from The Adventures of Rocky and Bullwinkle and Friends. Despite being a bookworm, his demeanor is far from boring; he is just as childlike and jocular as any regular eight-year-old. Even though he is the youngest of the group, he is the most responsible out of the squad, being the only one pure enough to not let himself get swayed by temptations. Depending on who he is siding with, he can either become loud and destructive (when Tuddrussel has him company) or composed and calm (when it's Larry he agrees with). It is unknown what happened to Otto's parents.
- Lawrence "Larry" 3000 (voiced by Mark Hamill) is described as "a prissy robot who thinks the whole mission is slightly beneath him. Think C3PO with metal bell-bottoms and without a sense of humor." His job is to make sure the squad ends up at the right time and place. Initially, he was programmed as a polyglottic robot for diplomatic purposes; when all of the nations rejoiced into one, huge country, his consular abilities were no longer needed. Larry is famous for his effeminate behavior and interests, which are portrayed all but subtly. Unusually, he is extremely dramatic and open in showing his emotions whilst still being the snarkiest of the trio. He prides himself on having knowledge of proper etiquette and manners. For Otto, he has been repeatedly depicted as a maternal figure.
- Beauregard "Buck" Tuddrussel (voiced by Rob Paulsen) is described as "a square-jawed cop too dumb to know he's dumb. Think Buzz Lightyear with a few extra male chromosomes." Whenever there is someone who needs a beating up (and even when they do not), he is the best person to get assigned for such a task. Impulsiveness, aggressiveness, and air-headedness are traits that define Tuddrussel quite nicely. Buck is easygoing toward Otto and prides himself on being the "fun" parent. Not much of his backstory is known, aside from his Southern heritage and a short-lived marriage to fellow time cop Sheila Sternwell.

==== Recurring ====
- Sheila Sternwell Tuddrussel (voiced by Mari Weiss) is a lieutenant within Time Squad ranks, Sheila is a no-nonsense woman that takes her job seriously. The ex-wife of Buck Tuddrussel, it is made clear that while she regrets making the mistake of marrying him in the first place, and can be slightly bitter towards him, she actually does not resent him and still does her job and helps out Tuddrussel and his unit when needed. She even seems to go far in not ratting out Tuddrussel and Larry over Otto, and other screw ups that she should be reporting.
- XJ5 (voiced by Daran Norris) is an advanced robot that is more qualified for the job of a time cop than Larry, and he loves to rub it in. Working with Officer Sternwell, XJ5 provides actual help and guidance on missions.

== Production ==
At a press conference on February 21, 2001, Cartoon Network announced that it had greenlit four new series, one of which was Time Squad, which was set to begin broadcasting in June. The announcement was the result of a $500 million investment granted to Cartoon Network during the previous year for expansion of original programming through 2005. Other series that came about as part of the deal were Samurai Jack, Grim & Evil, and Justice League.

Time Squad was created by Dave Wasson, who was known for animating short films on Nickelodeon's Oh Yeah! Cartoons such as Max & His Special Problem, which garnered Wasson a Daytime Emmy Award for production design in 1999. The series premiered during Cartoon Network's Friday night "Cartoon Cartoon Summer" block on June 8, 2001, at 9 PM EST. As part of the investment deal, the series was greenlit for 26 episodes.

== Broadcast ==
Time Squad launched on Cartoon Network and Boomerang's video-on-demand service in November 2002. The series was first broadcast in Australia in mid-2002 on Cartoon Network.

== Episodes ==
Season	Episodes	Originally released	
Season	Episodes	First released	Last released
1	13	June 8, 2001	October 26, 2001
2	13	February 1, 2002	November 26, 2003

Note: All episodes were directed by the series creator Dave Wasson, though Larry Leichliter co-directed "Keepin' It Real with Sitting Bull", "A Thrilla at Attila's", "Pasteur's Packs O' Punch", "Love at First Flight", "Child's Play", "Father Figure of Our Country", and "Floral Patton".

=== Season 1 (2001) ===
No. overall	No. in season	Title	Written by	Storyboard by	Original release date
1a	1a	"Eli Whitney's Flesh-Eating Mistake"	Dave Wasson and Carlos Ramos	Alex Almaguer	June 8, 2001
While searching for Eli Whitney (who is building flesh-eating robots instead of the Cotton gin), time cop Buck Tuddrussel and his robot partner the Larry 3000 end up at an orphanage in 2001, where they encounter an orphaned history buff named Otto Osworth. They take him away from the abusive nun Sister Thornley to complete their mission.
1b	1b	"Never Look a Trojan in the Gift Horse"	Carlos Ramos, Dave Wasson, and Michael Karnow	Chong Suk Lee	June 8, 2001
The Time Squad travels to the time of the Trojan War, where it is the King of Troy's birthday. The Greek army brings the Trojan Horse to the festivities but repeatedly fails to realize that it is not supposed to be an actual gift, but a trap. Ironically their mistaken attitude is exactly what defeats Troy.
2a	2a	"Napoleon the Conquered"	Dave Wasson and Carlos Ramos	Brandon Kruse	June 15, 2001
The Time Squad ends up in 18th century France, where Joséphine Bonaparte is henpecking the diminutive Napoleon, who is too cowardly to stop her. It is up to Time Squad to make Napoleon stand up to his wife so he can become the greatest emperor of France. Ironically Napoleon's next fight is the Battle of Waterloo, though Otto just dismisses it.
2b	2b	"Confucius Say... Way Too Much"	Michael Karnow, Dave Wasson, and Carlos Ramos	Lynell H. Forestall	June 15, 2001
The Time Squad is sent to help Chinese philosopher Confucius. It turns out that Confucius is performing his historical duty by devising clever aphorisms. Unfortunately, he uses them as the conclusions to extremely long-winded and boring novels that no one is reading. Otto gives Confucius a suggestion to shorten his conclusions to help attract customers.
3a	3a	"The Island of Dr. Freud"	Dave Wasson and Carlos Ramos	Chris Headrick	June 22, 2001
The Time Squad must convince Dr. Sigmund Freud to stop hypnotizing his patients into acting like animals, and to get him analyzing their dreams instead. To make things worse, Freud makes Tuddrussel think he is a chicken.
3b	3b	"Daddio DaVinci"	Dave Wasson, Michael Karnow, and Carlos Ramos	Alex Almaguer	June 22, 2001
The Time Squad meets up with the artist, scientist and inventor Leonardo da Vinci, who is now a beatnik. They eventually inspire him to become a painter again when they introduce him to a young waitress with a very mysterious and familiar smile.
4a	4a	"Big Al's Big Secret"	Dave Wasson, Carlos Ramos, and Michael Karnow	Brandon Kruse	June 29, 2001
The Time Squad travels to 1945, where Albert Einstein is now a brash car salesman in Texas named "Big Al" instead of being a scientist. Otto, who loves Einstein, is devastated when he sees the genius disguising his smarts, which eventually prompts a change of heart in "Big Al".
4b	4b	"Larry Upgrade"	Michael Karnow, Dave Wasson, and Carlos Ramos	Kurt Dumas	June 29, 2001
After arguing with Tuddrussel over being overworked and underappreciated, Larry tries to upgrade himself, but accidentally gets a downgrade. He becomes subservient to Tuddrussel and serves him nothing but hamburgers. Luckily, Otto discovers how to make Larry his old self again and upgrades him. However, Tuddrussel dismantles him in a fit of stupidity.
5a	5a	"Dishonest Abe"	Dave Wasson, Michael Karnow, and Carlos Ramos	Rob Renzetti	July 6, 2001
Abraham Lincoln grows tired of being the upstanding citizen "Honest Abe" and begins playing pranks on people. When Tuddrussel joins in on the fun, it is up to Larry and Otto to give both him and Abe a taste of their own medicine.
5b	5b	"Blackbeard, Warm Heart"	Michael Karnow, Dave Wasson, and Carlos Ramos	Lynell H. Forestall	July 6, 2001
The Time Squad goes back to the Golden Age of Piracy, where Blackbeard is more concerned about saving the environment than looting and pillaging. The Time Squad has Blackbeard compromise: he can still help save the environment, so long as he loots and pillages to collect funds.
6a	6a	"To Hail with Caesar"	Carlos Ramos and Dave Wasson	Kurt Dumas	July 13, 2001
The Time Squad travels to Ancient Rome to rebuild the flimsy city of Rome for Julius Caesar. By the time the mission is complete, Tuddrussel is hailed as the new leader and challenges Caesar to a gladiator match. Otto must train Caesar to overthrow Tuddrussel by teaching him karate.
6b	6b	"Robin 'n Stealin' with Mr. Hood"	Carlos Ramos, Dave Wasson, and Michael Karnow	Brandon Kruse	July 13, 2001
The Time Squad visits Robin Hood, who is now stealing from the poor and giving to the rich instead of the opposite. So Otto must teach Robin to properly follow history by showing him that stealing from the rich to the poor is beneficial to them, although the peasants are rude and disrespectful.
7a	7a	"If It's Wright It's Wrong"	Carlos Ramos and Dave Wasson	Chong Suk Lee	July 20, 2001
Otto learns that before he joined, Larry and Tuddrussel failed many missions such as Nostradamus, Lady Godiva, and Benjamin Franklin. The Time Squad then deals with the Wright brothers, who are incompetent stuntmen instead of building the very first airplane. Tuddrussel forces them to properly follow history by staying in their warehouse all night to do so.
7b	7b	"Recruitment Ad" (Short)	Dave Wasson, Carlos Ramos, and Michael Karnow	Lynell H. Forestall	July 20, 2001
A short piece advertising the thrills of being a time cop.
7c	7c	"Killing Time"	Michael Karnow, Carlos Ramos, and Dave Wasson	Mary Hanley	July 20, 2001
The Time Squad finishes a relatively easy assignment in helping Nicolaus Copernicus become an astronomer instead of a farmer, but the crew ends up waiting until Larry can restart his time travel software in order for them to go home. After they finally leave, Copernicus tries to stop them and ask what the sun is.
8a	8a	"Every Poe Has a Silver Lining"	Carlos Ramos, Dave Wasson, and Michael Karnow	Mary Hanley	August 31, 2001
The Time Squad discovers that famed horror writer Edgar Allan Poe is now an overly-cheerful children's book author, and must remind Poe of how horrible the world really is. Only by insulting his cooking do they finally manage to break his spirit and make him the master of macabre he is supposed to be.
8b	8b	"Betsy Ross Flies Her Freak Flag"	Michael Karnow, Dave Wasson, and Carlos Ramos	Alex Almaguer	August 31, 2001
The Time Squad gets a report from George Washington, whose troops are with Betsy Ross in her Woodstock-esque hippie farm. The peace-loving Ross is preventing the American Revolution with her protests. However, the Sons of Liberty help by bringing coffee and getting them to join Washington's cause. Ross sees the error of her ways and creates the first American flag.
9a	9a	"Ludwig van Bone-Crusher"	Michael Karnow, Dave Wasson, and Carlos Ramos	Kurt Dumas	September 14, 2001
The Time Squad is sent to the time of the great musician Ludwig van Beethoven, who is now a professional wrestler fighting other classical musicians-turned-wrestlers. Tuddrussel challenges Beethoven to a match to preserve the dignity of pro wrestling. When Tuddrussel is caught in a hopeless match, Otto uses Larry's radio station to have Beethoven listen to one of his future masterpieces, which helps him see the error of his ways.
9b	9b	"Tea Time for Time Squad"	Dave Wasson, Michael Karnow, and Carlos Ramos	Alex Almaguer	September 14, 2001
Larry is delighted to find that instead of staging the Boston Tea Party, the Sons of Liberty are having civilized tea parties. Tuddrussel and Otto have to convince them to dump the overtaxed colonial beverage for the sake of all America. To do that they must use coffee which makes the Sons of Liberty act just like Tuddrussel, much to Larry's disgust.
10a	10a	"The Prime Minister Has No Clothes"	Michael Karnow, Dave Wasson, and Carlos Ramos	Kurt Dumas	October 5, 2001
Winston Churchill, the prime minister who led England through World War II, is leading everyone into being naked, including Larry, Franklin D. Roosevelt, and Joseph Stalin. Churchill eventually changes his mind after seeing video footage of his large naked butt that Larry filmed.
10b	10b	"Nutorius"	Dave Wasson, Michael Karnow, and Carlos Ramos	Mary Hanley	October 5, 2001
The Time Squad goes back to the time of George Washington Carver, who is actually doing what he was famous for: making use of the peanut. Thus it is strange they would have to go there. The trouble comes when his evil twin brother Todd Washington Carver tries to make George look bad. Time Squad gets unexpected help in the form of peanut butter.
11a	11a	"Kubla Khan't"	Dave Wasson, Michael Karnow, and Carlos Ramos	Brandon Kruse	October 12, 2001
The Time Squad tries to reform Kublai Khan, who is now a comic book collector. Tuddrussel tries to deal with Khan himself by ripping up his comics, but it gets him sentenced to death. Larry and Otto cannot get Tuddrussel out legally, so Larry calls for backup in the form of Tuddrussel's ex-wife Sheila Sternwell (a more competent time cop) and her robot partner XJ5.
11b	11b	"Lewis and Clark and Larry"	Dave Wasson, Michael Karnow, and Carlos Ramos	Lynell H. Forestall	October 12, 2001
The Time Squad goes back to the era of the Lewis and Clark Expedition, where the exploring duo has broken up after an argument. While Lewis has a grand time exploring with Larry, Tuddrussel and Otto find Clark and become his exploring partners. However, Clark realizes that he is lost without Lewis to read the maps properly. When they meet up, Clark gets jealous that Larry is his new travel partner and begs Lewis to take him back which Lewis does.
12a	12a	"Ivan the Untrainable"	Michael Karnow, Dave Wasson, and Carlos Ramos	Lynell H. Forestall	October 19, 2001
After a mission to persuade Russian barbaric king Ivan the Terrible not to be an ice skater, Tuddrussel sneaks Ivan back on the satellite and keeps him as a pet (since he acts just like one), much to Larry's displeasure. Eventually, Larry has had enough and forces Tuddrussel to return Ivan at once.
12b	12b	"Where the Buffalo Bill Roams"	Carlos Ramos, Dave Wasson, and Michael Karnow	Rob Renzetti and Chong Suk Lee	October 19, 2001
Instead of helping form the Pony Express, Buffalo Bill is now a crazed conspiracy theorist with his own tabloid magazine that no one reads. Otto tricks him into following history by convincing him to deliver his conspiracy magazine to everyone while delivering their mail.
13a	13a	"Houdini Whodunnit!?"	Carlos Ramos, Dave Wasson, and Michael Karnow	Alex Almaguer	October 26, 2001
After losing a virtual reality game that involved an evil George Washington, the Time Squad goes on a mission to stop magician Harry Houdini who is using his illusions to commit crimes.
13b	13b	"Feud for Thought"	Carlos Ramos, Dave Wasson, and Michael Karnow	Gary Hartle	October 26, 2001
After Larry stands up to Tuddrussel, the Time Squad goes back to the time of the Hatfields and the McCoys, where the McCoys are refusing to fight. Larry's encouragement to maintain peace does not help. Otto encourages Tuddrussel to pay him back by using pranks to vandalize both properties. This makes the infamous feud continue.

=== Season 2 (2002–03) ===
No. overall	No. in season	Title	Written by	Storyboard by	Original release date
14a	1a	"A Sandwich by Any Other Name"	Michael Karnow, Dave Wasson, and Carlos Ramos	Sahin Ersöz	February 1, 2002
Earl of Sandwich gives his edible creation the terrible name "Stinky pile of poo" (his mother's maiden name) and presents it to the judge of a food contest, who won't even try it. Tuddrussel and Otto work with the Earl of Sandwich to promote his food which doesn't go well. Meanwhile, Larry's soufflés become a sensation to which he has been getting a lot of overwhelming deals. The Time Squad eventually gets the sandwich circulating, but only by having Otto name it.
14b	1b	"Shop Like an Egyptian"	Carlos Ramos, Dave Wasson, and Michael Karnow	Kurt Dumas	February 1, 2002
A mission to keep Cleopatra from turning the pyramids into a shopping mall proves difficult when Tuddrussel falls in love with her and Larry is eager to help with the project. Then Otto calls in Julius Caesar, who (just as in actual history) begins a romance with Cleopatra and persuades her to focus on ruling Egypt.
15a	2a	"Planet of the Flies"	Carlos Ramos, Dave Wasson, and Michael Karnow	Brandon Kruse	March 1, 2002
Tuddrussel squashes a fly during a mission to help Stone Age cavemen discover fire. It causes a butterfly effect in which Medieval England is attacked by a giant fly and the future is ruled by fly people (in a parody of Planet of the Apes).
15b	2b	"Keepin' It Real with Sitting Bull"	Michael Karnow, Dave Wasson, and Carlos Ramos	Trevor Wall	March 1, 2002
The Time Squad must deal with Sitting Bull, who wants to party with younger people after misinterpreting a vision from his ancestors. Tuddrussel does not help matters when he finds how much he likes Sitting Bull due to their shared love for partying. Otto and Larry trick Sitting Bull in time for the Battle of the Little Bighorn.
16a	3a	"A Thrilla at Attila's"	Carlos Ramos, Dave Wasson, and Michael Karnow	Trevor Wall	April 5, 2002
In a parody of Rashomon, Tuddrussel, Larry, and Otto each have different accounts of their mission to turn a cowardly Attila the Hun into a bloodthirsty fighter, and argue over which account to report to their boss. Otto's story turns out to be true. However, Tuddrussel and Larry are official Time Cops and they get to write whatever they want on the report, meaning they can omit Otto's version.
16b	3b	"Cabin Fever!"	Carlos Ramos, Dave Wasson, and Michael Karnow	Alex Almaguer	April 5, 2002
After a brutally violent mission to get Louis Armstrong playing jazz music instead of drilling to the center of the Earth, the Time Squad wishes they were not called on any more missions. The three get their wish, but soon become bored and descend into madness. Eventually, Larry discovers why they have not been getting new missions for the past few weeks: Tuddrussel had recharged his electric toothbrush in the computer's electric socket.
17a	4a	"Pasteur's Packs O' Punch"	Carlos Ramos, Dave Wasson, and Michael Karnow	Ty Schafrath	April 26, 2002
Larry gets electrocuted while fixing a fuse and experiences wild shifts in his personality (including acting drunk, becoming violent, and impersonating Jerry Lewis), leading the Time Squad to go back to the time of Louis Pasteur, who is making Kool-Aid-style fruit drinks instead of inventing pasteurized milk. To teach Pasteur a lesson, Otto inspires Marie Curie to make fruit popsicles, which are a bigger hit.
17b	4b	"Floundering Fathers"	Carlos Ramos, Dave Wasson, and Michael Karnow	Kurt Dumas	April 26, 2002
Otto catches a cold during the Time Squad's mission to get Karl Marx writing The Communist Manifesto instead of building the world's largest igloo. Without Otto helping them, Tuddrussel and Larry must complete a mission to make Benjamin Franklin help write the Declaration of Independence. Their various attempts see Tuddrussel beating up John Adams, Thomas Jefferson, and Benjamin Rush, Larry helping Franklin invent the lightbulb, and everyone arguing over how the Declaration of Independence should start. A sick Otto is brought in to assist them.
18a	5a	"The Clownfather"	Michael Karnow, Dave Wasson, and Carlos Ramos	Ed Baker	May 10, 2002
The Time Squad travels to the 1920s where gangster Al Capone, who had a traumatic childhood experience with a terrible clown, has made himself and all of his minions clowns. Otto, Tuddrussel, and Larry are mistaken for three of Capone's minions. After a disastrous birthday party gig, Otto shows Capone that the clowns he forced out of work are now trying to run his criminal empire with disastrous results.
18b	5b	"Hate and Let Hate"	Carlos Ramos, Dave Wasson, and Michael Karnow	Trevor Wall	May 10, 2002
Larry and Tuddrussel begin a feud and do not notice that they have left Otto on a deserted island following a mission to talk Hernando de Soto out of building a resort when he should be creating a colony in Cuba. While Otto desperately tries to survive, Larry and Tuddrussel isolate each other, only to experiment with each other's hobbies and come to an understanding. They return to save Otto from a group of mandrills.
19a	6a	"Love at First Flight"	Carlos Ramos, Dave Wasson, and Michael Karnow	Gary Hartle	May 17, 2002
Otto celebrates his birthday on the satellite where Tuddrussel gives him his own time cop suit. They must go back in time to cure a mysophobic Amelia Earhart so she can become the first female pilot to fly solo across the Atlantic Ocean. Tuddrussel's slovenly ways "cure" her, but she and Otto become just like him. Tuddrussel fixes his mistake when Earhart says she wants to marry him.
19b	6b	"Forget the Alamo"	Michael Karnow, Dave Wasson, and Carlos Ramos	Brandon Kruse	May 17, 2002
The Time Squad is sent to the Battle of the Alamo, where everyone there, including Tuddrussel's ancestor Jeremiah, is setting up a fiesta for the Mexican forces rather than defending themselves. When Larry refuses to cooperate by poorly assisting in the party decorations, it is up to Otto and Tuddrussel to save the mission. After the fiesta ends in battling, Jeremiah and the others blame Larry for it and defend the Alamo.
20a	7a	"Repeat Offender"	Michael Karnow, Dave Wasson, and Carlos Ramos	Kurt Dumas	June 7, 2002
Tuddrussel shows Otto a jail where they keep their repeat offenders, like Mahatma Gandhi who wants to tap dance instead of leading the Indian independence movement. For Time Squad's latest mission, Blackbeard has returned to environmentalism. Blackbeard escapes to Ancient Greece, where they must convince Socrates to be a philosopher rather than a fitness trainer. After capturing Blackbeard, he is put in a cell adjacent to Gandhi who taunts him with the flushing of the toilet.
20b	7b	"Ladies and Gentlemen... Monty Zuma"	Michael Karnow, Dave Wasson, and Carlos Ramos	Brandon Kruse	June 7, 2002
After Tuddrussel hurts Larry's feelings at his own art show, Otto tries to teach him to be more sensitive while they go on a mission to stop Aztec emperor Montezuma from performing stand-up comedy. Tuddrussel's sensitivity efforts and Larry's lack of appreciation lead to an insult contest between the two that wins the audience over.
21a	8a	"White House Weirdness"	Michael Karnow, Dave Wasson, and Carlos Ramos	Mary Hanley and Kevin Kaliher	June 14, 2002
In a parody of Scooby-Doo, Where Are You!, the Time Squad meets President William Howard Taft. Rumors that the White House is haunted by ghosts of former commanders in chief are keeping Woodrow Wilson from running for President. Otto, Larry, and Tuddrussel investigate and fight a zombie Zachary Taylor, vampire Benjamin Harrison, and Frankenstein-esque James Buchanan, and discover Taft's plot which gets him arrested.
21b	8b	"Nobel Peace Surprise"	Carlos Ramos, Dave Wasson, and Michael Karnow	Stephen Sandoval	June 14, 2002
The Time Squad goes on a mission to stop Alfred Nobel from giving Nobel Peace Prizes to people who commit evil acts and are soon assisted by Sheila and XJ5. This leads to a showdown with Alfred Nobel and his allies Black Bart, Jack the Ripper, Lizzie Borden, Grigori Rasputin, and Mrs. O'Leary's Cow. Otto persuades Nobel to give his prizes to people who do good.
22a	9a	"Out with the In Crowd"	Carlos Ramos, Dave Wasson, and Michael Karnow	Sahin Ersöz	November 8, 2002
The Time Squad goes on vacation rather than save Henry Morton Stanley from cannibals when he goes to find David Livingstone. This prompts J.T. Lazer and Lance 9 Trillion, an elite but arrogant Time Squad crew who are idols to Larry and Tuddrussel, to finish the job. Lazer and Lance use Time Squad as bait for the cannibals and save Henry. Otto states to an oblivious Tuddrussel and Larry that Lazer and Lance will take the credit for the mission.
22b	9b	"Child's Play"	Michael Karnow, Dave Wasson, and Carlos Ramos	Trevor Wall	November 8, 2002
In this self-referential episode, the Time Squad meets William Shakespeare, who is now doing kids' plays and finds inspiration in creating a new play from the Time Squad crew. Larry acts as a censor and Tuddrussel is too busy coming up with a new catchphrase to do anything about the situation. Eventually, Otto persuades Shakespeare to make plays for all ages.
23a	10a	"Day of the Larrys"	Michael Karnow, Dave Wasson, and Carlos Ramos	Brandon Kruse	March 21, 2003
Tired of being stuck with the chores, Larry uses his room full of spare parts to make a clone of himself. This starts a chain reaction that leads to a plethora of Larry 3000s, who turn the satellite into a resort.
23b	10b	"Old Timers Squad"	Dave Wasson, Carlos Ramos, and Michael Karnow	Ed Baker	March 21, 2003
Larry, Otto, and Tuddrussel become addicted to a trashy 1980s soap opera. Before they learn one of the show's big secrets, the Time Squad must go back in time to force Samuel Morse to invent Morse code. The crew gets a surprise when another Time Squad made up of elderly versions of themselves appears.
24a	11a	"Billy the Baby"	Carlos Ramos, Dave Wasson, and Michael Karnow	Ed Baker	March 28, 2003
The Time Squad encounters Billy the Kid, who is literally acting like a kid (wearing a diaper and bib and carrying around a rattle), making him a useless outlaw. The Time Squad becomes outlaws themselves to teach Billy the Kid how to be a proper criminal, and they end up getting chased by a Clint Eastwood-esque sheriff.
24b	11b	"Father Figure of Our Country"	Michael Karnow, Dave Wasson, and Carlos Ramos	Kurt Dumas	March 28, 2003
The Time Squad goes back in time to help George Washington, who is sick of being famous and wants to be a father. Otto happily fills the role of Washington's son, and while Tuddrussell tries to get Otto back, Larry is too busy shopping in colonial America to intervene. During the closing credits, there is a special credit that reads, "Mission SK77: Billy the Baby is dedicated to Sergio Leone and the great Tex Avery".
25a	12a	"Ex Marks the Spot"	Dave Wasson, Carlos Ramos, and Michael Karnow	Trevor Wall	April 4, 2003
The paths of Tuddrussel and Sheila's units meet again when their missions Joan of Arc and Johannes Gutenberg switch roles. Soon afterward, Tuddrussel and Sheila start to fall in love all over again which makes Larry worried that Tuddrussel may ditch him.
25b	12b	"Horse of Horrors"	Dave Wasson, Carlos Ramos, and Michael Karnow	Kurt Dumas	April 4, 2003
The Time Squad goes back in time to help Paul Revere overcome his fear of horses so he can do his Midnight Ride and warn the townspeople of Concord and Lexington that the British are coming. They discover Revere had suffered a childhood trauma because his first horse was hysterical and ruthless. Time Squad goes to pick up Sigmund Freud, who hypnotizes Revere into being a horse and together they make the Midnight Ride.
26a	13a	"Floral Patton"	Carlos Ramos, Dave Wasson, and Michael Karnow	Stephen Sandoval	November 26, 2003
The Time Squad goes back in time to find General George S. Patton running a florist shop, and he recruits Time Squad to fight back against a rival (replica) florist shop. Time Squad must convince Patton to end his business and head to Europe to fight in World War II. This happens when the patrons buy all of the plants in Patton's shop.
26b	13b	"Orphan Substitute"	Dave Wasson, Michael Karnow, and Carlos Ramos	Brandon Kruse	November 26, 2003
While on a mission in 2002 to have President George W. Bush forget about building the world's biggest ball of twine, Otto is taken back to the orphanage by Sister Thornley. Without Otto, Larry and Tuddrussel fail a mission centered on Christopher Columbus, who is working as a hot dog vendor instead of discovering the Americas. Larry and Tuddrussel unsuccessfully search for replacement orphans from the past, but finally go back to the orphanage to rescue Otto.

== Reception ==
Entertainment Weekly gave the series a B rating, calling it "fast and snappy, and you just might be able to trick your kid into a (somewhat tweaked) history lesson as well." In a review for the Houston Chronicle, contributor Lana Berkowitz rated the series a B, stating that it consisted of "more laughs than lessons".

=== Awards and nominations ===
Year	Award	Category	Nominee	Result	Ref.
2001	29th Annie Awards	Outstanding Achievement in a Primetime or Late Night Animated Television Production	Cartoon Network Studios	Nominated	
2001	29th Annie Awards	Outstanding Individual Achievement for Production Design in an Animated Television Production	Tim Biskup	Nominated	
2001	29th Annie Awards	Outstanding Individual Achievement for Voice Acting by a Female Performer in an Animated Television Production	Pamela Adlon (as Otto Osworth for "Eli Whitney's Flesh Eating Mistake")	Nominated	
2002	30th Annie Awards	Outstanding Character Design in an Animated Television Production	Alex Kirwan (for "The Clownfather")	Nominated	
2002	30th Annie Awards	Outstanding Production Design in an Animated Television Production	Dave Wasson (for "Keepin' It Real with Sitting Bull")	Nominated	

== Merchandise ==
=== Home media releases ===
A DVD consisting of the first three episodes of the series was released in the United Kingdom by Boulevard Entertainment.

=== Promotions ===
Cartoon Network and Subway partnered to release five Time Squad-themed toys in Subway Kids Paks. The promotion lasted from September 30 to November 17, 2002.
